= Dulab, Iran =

Dulab or Doolab or Dowlab (Persian: دولاب) may refer to:

- Dulab-e Karanlu, East Azerbaijan Province
- Dulab-e Bala, Fars Province
- Dulab-e Pain, Fars Province
- Dulab, Hormozgan
- Dulab, Isfahan
- Dulab, Manujan, Kerman Province
- Dulab, Qaleh Ganj, Kerman Province
- Dulab-e Shirin, Kohgiluyeh and Boyer-Ahmad Province
- Dulab-e Talkh, Kohgiluyeh and Boyer-Ahmad Province
- Dulab, Kurdistan
- Dulab, Yazd
- Dulab, Zanjan
- Dulab Rural District, in Hormozgan Province
