= Chahu =

Chahu or Chahoo (Persian: چاهو) may refer to:

- Chahu, Mohr, Fars Province
- Chahu, Bandar Abbas, Hormozgan Province
- Chahu Genow-e Pain, Bandar Abbas County, Hormozgan Province
- Chahu Golzar, Hajjiabad County, Hormozgan Province
- Chahu, Khamir, Hormozgan Province
- Chahu, Qeshm, Hormozgan Province
- Chahu-ye Gharbi, Qeshm County, Hormozgan Province
- Chahu-ye Sharqi, Qeshm County, Hormozgan Province
- Chahuiyeh, Zarand, Zarand County, Kerman Province
- chá hú, the Chinese term for teapot
