= Dulab (disambiguation) =

Dulab (Persian: دولاب) or its variants may refer to:

== Iran ==
=== East Azerbaijan province ===
- Dulab-e Karanlu, a village in Khoda Afarin County

=== Fars province ===
- Dulab-e Pain, a village in Arsanjan County

=== Hormozgan province ===
- Dulab, Hormozgan, a village in Qeshm County
- Dulab Rural District, an administrative division of Qeshm County

=== Kerman province ===
- Dulab, Qaleh Ganj, a village in Qaleh Ganj County

=== Kohgiluyeh and Boyer-Ahmad province ===
- Dulab-e Shirin, a village in Kohgiluyeh County

=== Kurdistan province ===
- Dulab, Kurdistan, a village in Kamyaran County

=== Lorestan province ===
- Dulabi-ye Badamak, a village in Pol-e Dokhtar County

=== West Azerbaijan province ===
- Dulehbi, a village in Sardasht County
