= Hengam =

Hengam or Hangam (Persian: هنگام), also rendered as Henjam, may refer to:

- Hengam Island
- Hengam-e Jadid
- Hengam-e Qadim
- Hengam Rural District (disambiguation)
