= Riku, Iran =

Riku (Persian: ريكو) may refer to:

- Riku, Hormozgan
- Riku, Babol, Mazandaran Province
- Riku, Savadkuh, Mazandaran Province

== See also ==
- Rigu (disambiguation)
