= Rigu =

Rigu or Reygu (Persian: ريگو), also rendered as Rigu, may refer to:

- Rigu, Bandar Abbas, Hormozgan Province
- Rigu, Qeshm, Hormozgan Province
- Rigu Bovingdon, Anglo-Maltese Australian writer and musician

== See also ==
- Riku, Iran (disambiguation)
