= Kani, Hormozgan =

Kani كاني
- Village
- Location within Iran
- Coordinates: 26°35′19″N 55°24′40″E
- Country: Iran
- Province: Hormozgan
- County: Qeshm
- Bakhsh: Shahab
- Rural District: Dulab

Population (2006)
  - Total: 311
- Time zone: UTC+3:30 (IRST)
  - Summer (DST): UTC+4:30 (IRDT)

Kani (Persian: كاني, also Romanized as Kānī; also known as Kahni, Kohneh, and Kownī) is a village in Dulab Rural District, Shahab District, Qeshm County, Hormozgan Province, Iran. At the 2006 census, its population was 311, in 65 families.
