= Haft Rangu =

Haft Rangu هفترنگو
- Village
- Location within Iran
- Coordinates: 26°45′03″N 55°44′44″E
- Country: Iran
- Province: Hormozgan
- County: Qeshm
- Bakhsh: Shahab
- Rural District: Salakh

Population (2006)
  - Total: 513
- Time zone: UTC+3:30 (IRST)
  - Summer (DST): UTC+4:30 (IRDT)

Haft Rangu (Persian: هفترنگو, also Romanized as Haft Rangū; also known as Haft Rang) is a village in Salakh Rural District, Shahab District, Qeshm County, Hormozgan Province, Iran. At the 2006 census, its population was 513, in 100 families.
