= Durbeni =

Durbeni دوربني
- Village
- Location within Iran
- Coordinates: 26°44′22″N 55°39′41″E
- Country: Iran
- Province: Hormozgan
- County: Qeshm
- Bakhsh: Shahab
- Rural District: Salakh

Population (2006)
  - Total: 616
- Time zone: UTC+3:30 (IRST)
  - Summer (DST): UTC+4:30 (IRDT)

Durbeni (Persian: دوربني, also Romanized as Dūrbenī and Dūrbonī) is a village in Salakh Rural District, Shahab District, Qeshm County, Hormozgan Province, Iran. At the 2006 census, its population was 616, in 155 families.
