= Shahrak-e Parvaz =

Shahrak-e Parvaz شهرك پرواز
- Village
- Country: Iran
- Province: Hormozgan
- County: Qeshm
- Bakhsh: Shahab
- Rural District: Salakh

Population (2006)
  - Total: 105
- Time zone: UTC+3:30 (IRST)
  - Summer (DST): UTC+4:30 (IRDT)

Shahrak-e Parvaz (Persian: شهرك پرواز, also Romanized as Shahrak-e Parvāz) is a village in Salakh Rural District, Shahab District, Qeshm County, Hormozgan Province, Iran. At the 2006 census, its population was 105, in 33 families.
