= Sahali, Iran =

Sohayli سهلی or سهیلی
- Village
- Location within Iran
- Coordinates: 26°45′11″N 55°47′08″E
- Country: Iran
- Province: Hormozgan
- County: Qeshm
- Bakhsh: Shahab
- Rural District: Salakh

Population (2006)
  - Total: 1,480
- Time zone: UTC+3:30 (IRST)
  - Summer (DST): UTC+4:30 (IRDT)

Sahali (Persian: سهلی or سهیلی, also Romanized as Saḩalī and Sohlī; also known as Soheylī) is a village in Salakh Rural District, Shahab District, Qeshm County, Hormozgan Province, Iran. At the 2006 census, its population was 1,480 in 300 families.
