= Naqasheh =

Naqasheh نقاشه
- Village
- Location within Iran
- Coordinates: 26°44′06″N 55°50′24″E
- Country: Iran
- Province: Hormozgan
- County: Qeshm
- Bakhsh: Shahab
- Rural District: Salakh

Population (2006)
  - Total: 108
- Time zone: UTC+3:30 (IRST)
  - Summer (DST): UTC+4:30 (IRDT)

Naqasheh (Persian: نقاشه, also Romanized as Naqāsheh) is a village in Salakh Rural District, Shahab District, Qeshm County, Hormozgan Province, Iran. At the 2006 census, its population was 108, in 26 families.
