= Nakhl-e Gol =

Nakhl-e Gol نخل گل
- Village
- Location within Iran
- Coordinates: 26°51′32″N 56°06′42″E
- Country: Iran
- Province: Hormozgan
- County: Qeshm
- Bakhsh: Shahab
- Rural District: Suza

Population (2006)
  - Total: 218
- Time zone: UTC+3:30 (IRST)
  - Summer (DST): UTC+4:30 (IRDT)

Nakhl-e Gol (Persian: نخل گل) is a village in Suza Rural District, Shahab District, Qeshm County, Hormozgan Province, Iran. At the 2006 census, its population was 218, in 39 families.
