= Sarkuh =

Sarkuh (Persian: سركوه) may refer to:

- Sarkuh, Hormozgan
- Sarkuh-e Shahid Deli Bajak, Kohgiluyeh and Boyer-Ahmad Province
