= Qarah Quch =

Qarah Quch or Qareh Quch (Persian: قره قوچ) may refer to:

- Qarah Quch, Ardabil
- Qareh Quch, East Azerbaijan
- Qareh Quch-e Min Bashi, East Azerbaijan Province
