= Qil =

Qil قيل
- Village
- Location within Iran
- Coordinates: 26°38′50″N 55°51′31″E
- Country: Iran
- Province: Hormozgan
- County: Qeshm
- Bakhsh: Shahab
- Rural District: Hengam

Population (2006)
  - Total: 27
- Time zone: UTC+3:30 (IRST)
  - Summer (DST): UTC+4:30 (IRDT)

Qil (Persian: قيل, also Romanized as Qīl; also known as Ghail, Gheyl, Ghīl, Gīl, and Kheyl) is a village in Hengam Rural District, Shahab District, Qeshm County, Hormozgan Province, Iran. At the 2006 census, its population was 27, in 5 families.
