= Kalaleh =

Kalaleh (Persian: كلاله) may refer to:

- Kalaleh, Golestan, a city in Golestan Province, Iran
- Kalaleh, Kaleybar, East Azerbaijan Province
- Kalaleh, Khoda Afarin, East Azerbaijan Province
- Kalaleh-ye Olya, East Azerbaijan Province
- Kalaleh-ye Sofla, East Azerbaijan Province
- Kalaleh, Kurdistan
- Kalaleh County, in Golestan Province
