= Dustku =

Dustku دوستكو
- Village
- Location within Iran
- Coordinates: 26°34′24″N 55°20′07″E
- Country: Iran
- Province: Hormozgan
- County: Qeshm
- Bakhsh: Shahab
- Rural District: Dulab

Population (2006)
  - Total: 479
- Time zone: UTC+3:30 (IRST)
  - Summer (DST): UTC+4:30 (IRDT)

Dustku (Persian: دوستكو, also Romanized as Dūstkū; also known as Dūstekūh) is a village in Dulab Rural District, Shahab District, Qeshm County, Hormozgan Province, Iran. At the 2006 census, its population was 479, in 120 families.
