= Portuguese sack of Qeshm =

1728 military raid

- Part of Portuguese–Safavid wars
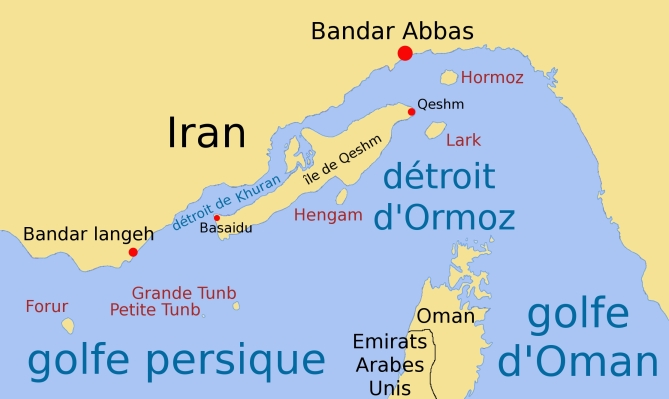
- Map of the Qeshm Island area
Date	22 June or 31 July 1728
Location	Qeshm Island
Result	Portuguese victory

Belligerents
Kingdom of Portugal	Safavid Empire; Sheikdom of Bani Main

Commanders and leaders
D. Álvaro de Navia y Cienfuegos	Sheikh Abdul Rashid; Sayyid Ali Khan (POW)

Strength
4 ships ~500 men	240 men

Casualties and losses
1 killed 5 wounded	22 chests captured 1 galliot captured

The Portuguese sack of Qeshm (or the Portuguese Intermezzo) was a military raid conducted by the Kingdom of Portugal in 1728 against the Safavid island of Qeshm. It marked the final Portuguese military operation in the Persian Gulf.

== Background ==
The city of Kong, once a stronghold of Portuguese presence, had been looted by the Afghans, forcing the last Portuguese feitor to escape the burning city in a rowboat, thus ending the permanent Portuguese presence in the Persian Gulf. Afterwards, Sheikh Abdul Rashid of Bani Main, also ruler of Basaidu, sought to establish a new power base offshore at Basaidu on Qeshm Island. As the customs officer or shahbandar of Bandar Abbas, he used his position to redirect maritime traffic from Gombroon to Qeshm under the pretense of customs duties. He also gave refuge to the displaced residents of Kong. These actions upset both the British, who were losing customs revenue from Bandar Abbas, and the Portuguese, who saw their tributes from Kong disappear.

== Sack ==
On June 22 or July 31, 1728 (according to Dutch records), a Portuguese flotilla under D. Álvaro de Navia y Cienfuegos arrived in the Gulf, making a brief return to Kong, apparently seeking either to revive trade or extort money from local authorities. However, the real motive was extortion and the reassertion of Portuguese claims in the region. Four ships arrived but soon sailed for Basaidu on Qeshm Island. The expedition was undertaken without the approval of King John V, who later demanded an explanation from the viceroy. Upon arrival at Kong, they found the town in ruins by the Afghan invasions, its once famous buildings destroyed and its population gone, most having fled to Qeshm Island. The fleet then proceeded to Qeshm, where Don Álvaro dispatched his Comptroller, on June 27, to collect prizes from Sheikh Rashid, stating that these were owed to the King of Portugal. Rashid paid only 228 tumans, claiming he had collected no more. An armed force was sent to confiscate everything belonging to the Sheikh, including a galliot and two or three terradas in Laft, though the Portuguese failed to seize them.

Meanwhile, the British East India Company sent the frigate Britannia to Basaidu with orders to "surprise those rogues", take all local shipping, and bombard the town. Although Sheikh Rashid had recently agreed to pay the British 1,000 tumans in customs revenue, the Portuguese fleet arrived unexpectedly from Mombasa. Their force consisted of 500 Europeans, along with a number of Sindhis, with whom they likely cooperated for the operation. Following their usual practice, the Portuguese landed, raised the flag of Aviz over Basaidu for two weeks, and looted both the town and parts of Qeshm Island. They also occupied the customs office in Basaidu and looted Sheikh Rashid's property. Although most of the population had fled, the Portuguese plundered an ancient tomb considered sacred by the Bani Main, taking old Basaidu which were later sent to the Lisbon Academy of Sciences. Over 22 sealed chests, containing jewels and coin, were seized from the island, while the rest of the spoils went to the soldiers. They also arrested Sayyid Ali Khan, the shahbandar, and took him aboard ship. Despite these raids, the fleet failed to establish a new factory in Kong or force the surrender of Hormuz, both of which had been primary objectives instructed to the admiral.

Sheik Rashid, seeing that the Portuguese had withdrawn from Laft, quickly returned with 240 men to defend his ships. When the Portuguese attempted to intercept his vessels, he opened fire, killing one soldier and wounding five others, while the Portuguese managed to capture only a galliot. Don Álvaro eventually offered Rashid a safe conduct pass in exchange for 500 tumans for the King of Portugal, gifts for himself and his intermediaries, and a mare and two fabrics for the viceroy. Rashid did not trust Don Álvaro and refused to comply.

== Aftermath ==
These assaults were the last Portuguese military actions in the Persian Gulf. The Portuguese fleet attempted to reestablish their presence in the region in 1730, but without success. The looting of Basaidu ended Sheik Rashid's efforts to develop Qeshm, an outcome that aligned with British objectives. Although Rashid remained among the wealthiest merchants in the Gulf, his town was unable to emerge as a regional center, and trade moved instead to Bushehr and Basra.

In 1729, French geographer Jean-Baptiste Bourguignon d'Anville met D. Alvaro de Navia y Cienfuegos and obtained direct information about conditions on Qeshm. He wrote:

In 1729, I learned from a Spanish gentleman in the service of Portugal, D. Alvaro de Navia y Cienfuegos, who was then returning from Mombasa on the African coast, and who knew the Persian Gulf from having sailed there, that near the tip of Kesem or Kismis, and a little inside the canal that ends at Ser-Mion, a new town had formed due to the revolution that occurred in Persia, populated by Persian and Armenian refugees, mixed with Arabs: that an Arab lord, called Sheik-el-Rasset, had established an independent principality in this district, exerting influence over all the shores of the gulf. Teixeira, being in Basra in 1604, speaks of a lord or Sheik of the same name, Ben-Rasset, settled around that city; and Pietro della Valle, who was in Persia a few years later, mentions an Arab near Muscat, also distinguished by the name of Rasset. The city I just mentioned is called Bacido; and it is not an entirely new settlement; for I noticed that Duarte Barbosa, a Portuguese, makes mention of it in the list of places owned by the kings of Ormus on the Persian coast, as can be seen in Ramusio's collection.

== Bibliography ==
- Barendse, Rene (October 26, 2009). Arabian Seas 1700. Vol. 1. BRILL. ISBN 9789047430025.
- Floor, Willem M. (2006). A political and economic history of five port cities, 1500-1730. Washington, DC: Mage Publishers. ISBN 9781933823126.
- Floor, Willem M.; Potts, D. T. (November 21, 2024). Qeshm: The History A Persian Gulf Island. Mage Publishers Incorporated. ISBN 9781949445862.
- Slot, B. J. (1993). Arabs Of The Gulf (1602-1784) (in Arabic). B.J. Slot. ISBN 9789090058726.
- Potts, D. T. (2011). "The Portuguese on Qeshm". academia.edu.
