= Guri, Hormozgan =

Guri گوري
- Village
- Location within Iran
- Coordinates: 26°37′57″N 55°21′28″E
- Country: Iran
- Province: Hormozgan
- County: Qeshm
- Bakhsh: Shahab
- Rural District: Dulab

Population (2006)
  - Total: 726
- Time zone: UTC+3:30 (IRST)
  - Summer (DST): UTC+4:30 (IRDT)

Guri (Persian: گوري, also Romanized as Gūrī and Goori; also known as Gūreh and Gūrmī) is a village in Dulab Rural District, Shahab District, Qeshm County, Hormozgan Province, Iran. At the 2006 census, its population was 726, in 151 families.
