= Dar Kuh =

Dar Kuh دركوه
- Village
- Location within Iran
- Coordinates: 26°38′28″N 55°23′33″E
- Country: Iran
- Province: Hormozgan
- County: Qeshm
- Bakhsh: Shahab
- Rural District: Dulab

Population (2006)
  - Total: 550
- Time zone: UTC+3:30 (IRST)
  - Summer (DST): UTC+4:30 (IRDT)

Dar Kuh (Persian: دركوه, also Romanized as Dar Kūh; also known as Darkoo’eyeh, Darkū’īyeh, Dīrāku, and Sarkūh) is a village in Dulab Rural District, Shahab District, Qeshm County, Hormozgan province, Iran. At the 2006 census, its population was 550, in 117 families.
