= Chighitma =

Iranian breakfast dish

Chighitma, also spelled chighirtma (Azeri: چیغیتما) is a dish from Ardabil usually served as breakfast and accompanied by local bread. The meaning of the name chighitma is literally "to scream," which comes from the method of cooking. The skill of cooking chighitma was placed on Iran's list of intangible cultural heritage.
