= Guran, Hormozgan =

Gambron گامبرون
- Village
- Location within Iran
- Coordinates: 26°41′19″N 55°41′31″E
- Country: Iran
- Province: Hormozgan
- County: Qeshm
- Bakhsh: Shahab
- Rural District: Salakh

Population (2006)
  - Total: 1,131
- Time zone: UTC+3:30 (IRST)
  - Summer (DST): UTC+4:30 (IRDT)

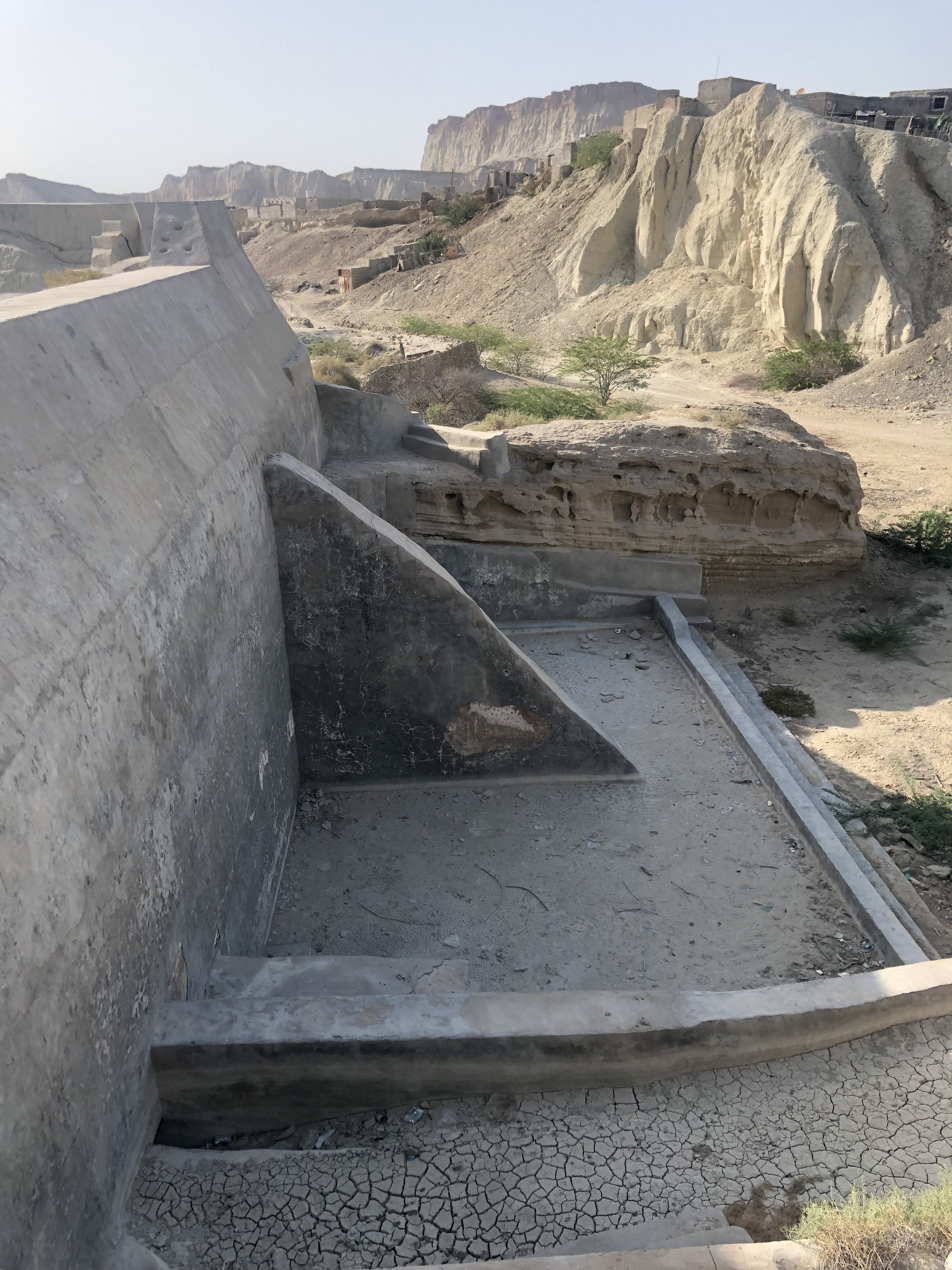

Gambron (Persian: گامبرون, also Romanized as Gambron; also known as Bandar-e Gambron) is a village in Salakh Rural District, Shahab District, Qeshm County, Hormozgan Province, Iran. At the 2006 census, its population was 1,131, in 282 families.
