= Chahu-ye Gharbi =

Chahu-ye Gharbi چاهوغربي
- Village
- Location within Iran
- Coordinates: 26°41′02″N 55°28′54″E
- Country: Iran
- Province: Hormozgan
- County: Qeshm
- Bakhsh: Shahab
- Rural District: Dulab

Population (2006)
  - Total: 527
- Time zone: UTC+3:30 (IRST)
  - Summer (DST): UTC+4:30 (IRDT)

Chahu-ye Gharbi (Persian: چاهوغربي, also Romanized as Chāhū-ye Gharbī and Chāhū Gharbī; also known as Chāhū Qebleh) is a village in Dulab Rural District, Shahab District, Qeshm County, Hormozgan Province, Iran. At the 2006 census, its population was 527, in 107 families.
