= Kanzeh Rud =

Kanzeh Rud كنزه رود
- Village
- Location within Iran
- Coordinates: 38°54′46″N 46°39′05″E
- Country: Iran
- Province: East Azerbaijan
- County: Khoda Afarin
- Bakhsh: Minjavan
- Rural District: Minjavan-e Gharbi

Population (2006)
  - Total: 142
- Time zone: UTC+3:30 (IRST)
  - Summer (DST): UTC+4:30 (IRDT)

Kanzeh Rud (Persian: كنزه رود, also Romanized as Kanzeh Rūd; also known as Ganzerūd, Ganz Rūd, Kanz Rūd, and Kyanzary) is a village in Minjavan-e Gharbi Rural District, Minjavan District, Khoda Afarin County, East Azerbaijan Province, Iran. At the 2006 census, its population was 142, in 25 families.
