= Donna Kooler =

Donna Kooler is the president, designer, and creative director of Kooler Design Studio, a company she founded in 1985. Donna graduated from art school in Los Angeles in the 1950s. In 1973 she became Design Director for Sunset Designs, a needlework kit company in Northern California. Donna is also the author of over 20 books, primarily in the fields of needlework and knitting.

Under her direction, Kooler Design Studio has expanded into other crafts over recent years to include painting, gift projects, knitting, quilting as well as lifestyle, and has published over 600 books and kits in conjunction with Janlynn, Leisure Arts, and other publishers. Kooler Design represents some of the industry's leading artists including Linda Gillum, Barbara Baatz Hillman, Nancy Rossi, Basha Kooler and Sandy Orton.
