= Tomges =

Tomges تم گس
- Village
- Location within Iran
- Coordinates: 26°40′38″N 55°26′57″E
- Country: Iran
- Province: Hormozgan
- County: Qeshm
- Bakhsh: Shahab
- Rural District: Dulab

Population (2006)
  - Total: 162
- Time zone: UTC+3:30 (IRST)
  - Summer (DST): UTC+4:30 (IRDT)

Tomges (Persian: تم گس, also Romanized as Tomegs; also known as Tonges and Tongsar) is a village in Dulab Rural District, Shahab District, Qeshm County, Hormozgan Province, Iran. At the 2006 census, its population was 162, in 34 families.
