= Musa Kandi =

Musa Kandi موسي كندي
- Village
- Location within Iran
- Coordinates: 38°50′44″N 46°42′32″E
- Country: Iran
- Province: East Azerbaijan
- County: Khoda Afarin
- Bakhsh: Minjavan
- Rural District: Minjavan-e Gharbi

Population (2006)
  - Total: 45
- Time zone: UTC+3:30 (IRST)
  - Summer (DST): UTC+4:30 (IRDT)

Musa Kandi (Persian: موسي كندي, also Romanized as Mūsá Kandī; also known as Musakend) is a village in Minjavan-e Gharbi Rural District, Minjavan District, Khoda Afarin County, East Azerbaijan Province, Iran. At the 2006 census, its population was 45, in 9 families.
