= Construction of Iranian Lenj boats =

Boat-building tradition of the inhabitants

Traditional skills of building and sailing Iranian Lenj boats in the Persian Gulf
- UNESCO Intangible Cultural Heritage
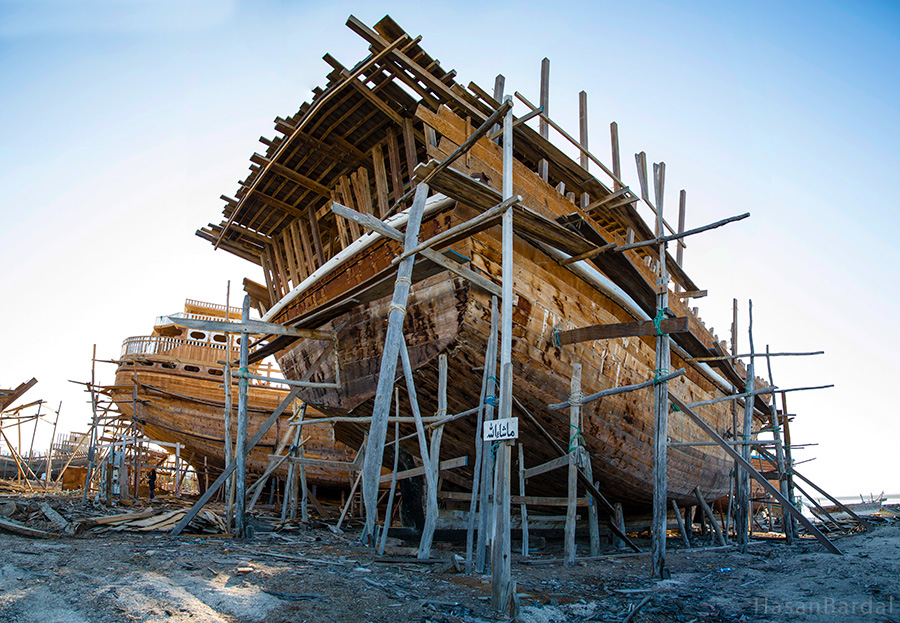
- Lenj building workshop in Goran Port, Qeshm Island
- Country: Iran
- Reference: 00534
- Region: Asia and the Pacific

Inscription history
- Inscription: 2011 (6th session)
- List: Need of Urgent Safeguarding

Lenj boats are built by the people of southern Iran and the inhabitants of the Persian Gulf for two main purposes: passenger transport and cargo shipping. They are used for maritime travel, trade, fishing, and pearl diving. Traditionally, Lenj boats are handcrafted using wood. Most wooden Lenj-building workshops are located in the provinces of Hormozgan, Bushehr, Sistan and Baluchestan, and Khuzestan.

The ports of Laft, Goran, Pohl, Kong, and Jask in Hormozgan Province, along with Genaveh and Chabahar, are among the key centers for Lenj boats construction in Iran. Iranian sailors build these boats by considering the position of the sun, moon, and stars, using a specific formula to calculate latitude and longitude, as well as assessing water depth and weather forecasts.

The process of Lenj boats construction has its own unique music and rhythms, with workers singing traditional chants while working. However, due to the high costs and long construction time of wooden Lenj boats, modern sailors now prefer fiberglass boats. This shift has led to the gradual fading of the culture, knowledge, and rituals associated with traditional wooden Lenj building.

In 2011, the "Traditional skills of building and sailing Iranian Lenj boats in the Persian Gulf" was registered on the UNESCO Intangible Heritage List of elements in Need of Urgent Safeguarding in Iran.

== Gallery ==
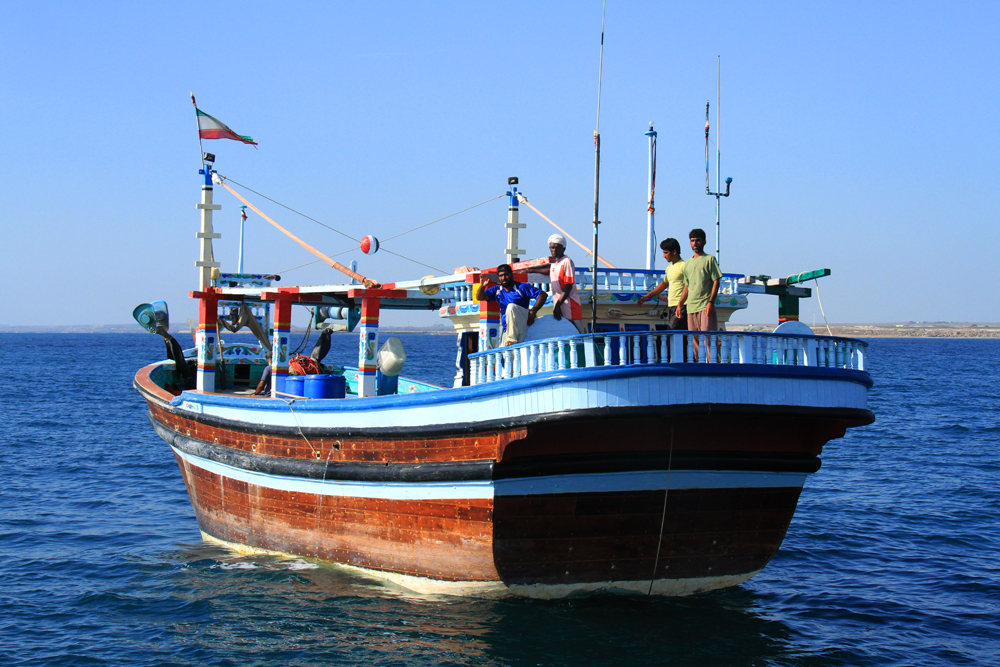
A small Iranian lenj (ship) in the open waters of Chabahar

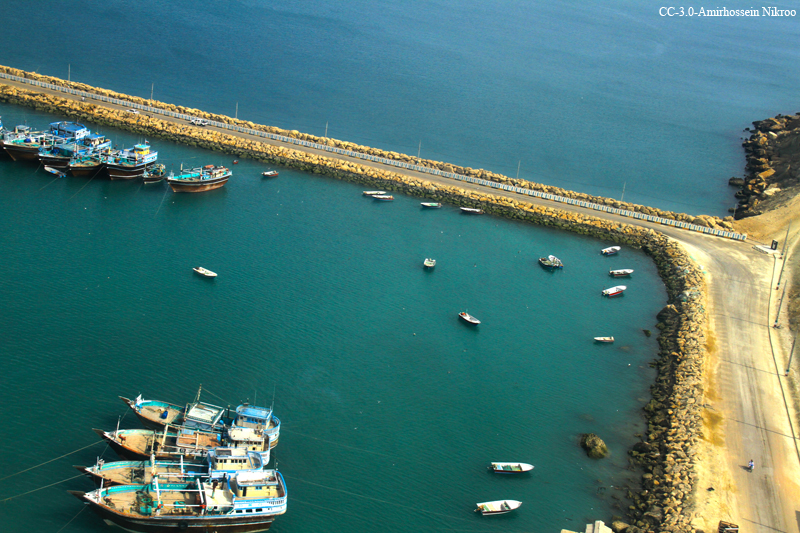
Lenjes moored at the Konarak Pier in the Chabahar Watershed
