= Teymur Beyglu =

Teymur Beyglu تيموربيگلو
- Village
- Location within Iran
- Coordinates: 38°56′13″N 46°41′39″E
- Country: Iran
- Province: East Azerbaijan
- County: Khoda Afarin
- Bakhsh: Minjavan
- Rural District: Minjavan-e Gharbi

Population (2006)
  - Total: 54
- Time zone: UTC+3:30 (IRST)
  - Summer (DST): UTC+4:30 (IRDT)

Teymur Beyglu (Persian: تيموربيگلو, also Romanized as Teymūr Beyglū) is a village in Minjavan-e Gharbi Rural District, Minjavan District, Khoda Afarin County, East Azerbaijan Province, Iran. At the 2006 census, its population was 54, consisting of 11 families.
