= Chahu-ye Sharqi =

Village in Hormozgan, Iran

Chahu-ye Sharqi چاهوشرقي
- Village
- Location within Iran
- Coordinates: 26°41′30″N 55°30′32″E
- Country: Iran
- Province: Hormozgan
- County: Qeshm
- Bakhsh: Shahab
- Rural District: Dulab

Population (2006)
  - Total: 919
- Time zone: UTC+3:30 (IRST)
  - Summer (DST): UTC+4:30 (IRDT)

Chahu-ye Sharqi (Persian: چاهوشرقي, also Romanized as Chāhū-ye Sharqī) is a village in Dulab Rural District, Shahab District, Qeshm County, Hormozgan Province, Iran. At the 2006 census, its population was 919, in 202 families. The village is a coastal town located near the Strait of Hormuz. Nearby tourist attractions include the Chahkooh Canyon.
