= Ayeshehabad =

Ayeshehabad عايشه اباد
- Village
- Location within Iran
- Coordinates: 26°41′10″N 55°30′51″E
- Country: Iran
- Province: Hormozgan
- County: Qeshm
- Bakhsh: Shahab
- Rural District: Dulab

Population (2006)
  - Total: 77
- Time zone: UTC+3:30 (IRST)
  - Summer (DST): UTC+4:30 (IRDT)

Ayeshehabad (Persian: عايشه اباد, also Romanized as ‘Āyeshehābād; also known as Chāhū, Chāḩū Gharbī, and Chāhū Qebleh) is a village in Dulab Rural District, Shahab District, Qeshm County, Hormozgan Province, Iran. At the 2006 census, its population was 77, in 18 families.
