= Basaidu =

Village in Hormozgan province, Iran

Basaidu Persian: باسعيدو
- Village
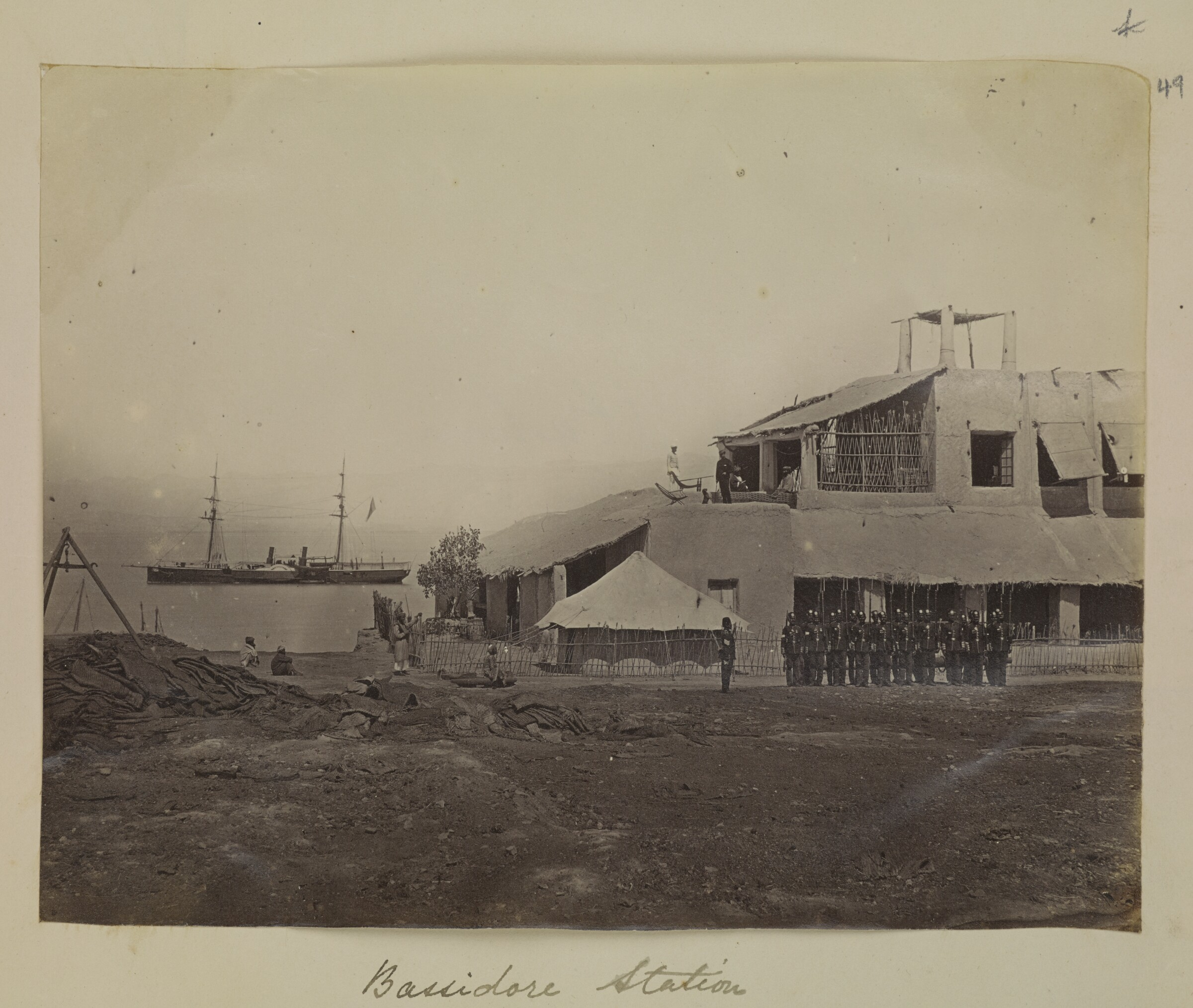
- Indian troops parade at Bassidore (Basaidu) Station, circa 1870

- Location within Iran
- Coordinates: 26°38′57″N 55°17′09″E
- Country: Iran
- Province: Hormozgan
- County: Qeshm
- District: Hara
- Rural District: Dulab

Population (2016)
  - Total: 2,228
- Time zone: UTC+3:30 (IRST)

Basaidu (Persian: باسعيدو) (Note: Also romanized as Bāsa‘īdū and Bāsa‘īdow; also known as Bāsīdu) is a village in Dulab Rural District of Hara District, Qeshm County, Hormozgan province, Iran.

== Etymology ==
Despite phonetic similarity, Basaidu is not derived from the dynastic name of the Bu Saidi sultans of Oman who in fact ruled Qeshm Island and vicinity until the mid 19th century. Instead, the name is the ancient Greek/Hellenistic Poseidonia, named after the sea god, Poseidon. Further up the Persian Gulf, ports of Apollonia (Obolla) and Apollodorus (Abadan), among others, likewise carry ancient Hellenistic names.

== Demographics ==
=== Population ===
At the time of the 2006 National Census, the village's population was 1,662 in 359 households, when it was in Shahab District. The following census in 2011 counted 1,989 people in 465 households. The 2016 census measured the population of the village as 2,228 people in 520 households. It was the most populous village in its rural district.

In 2017, the rural district was separated from the district in the formation of Hara District.
