= Tabl =

Tabl may refer to:

- Tabl, Iran, a village in Hormozgan Province, Iran
- A Persian name for the Indian drums known as tabla
- A large drum from Turkey, Bulgaria, Macedonia, and the Middle East also known as davul or tapan
