= Mesen, Hormozgan =

Village in Hormozgan province, Iran

Mesen Persian: مسن
- Village
- Location within Iran
- Coordinates: 26°44′40″N 56°00′26″E
- Country: Iran
- Province: Hormozgan
- County: Qeshm
- District: Shahab
- Rural District: Suza

Population (2016)
  - Total: 2,162
- Time zone: UTC+3:30 (IRST)

Mesen (Persian: مسن) (Note: Also romanized as Masen and Mosen) is a village in Suza Rural District of Shahab District, Qeshm County, Hormozgan province, Iran.

== Demographics ==
=== Population ===
At the time of the 2006 National Census, the village's population was 1,623 in 352 households. The following census in 2011 counted 2,002 people in 525 households. The 2016 census measured the population of the village as 2,162 people in 584 households. It was the most populous village in its rural district.
