= Gureh =

Gureh may refer to:

- Goreh, Bushehr
- Guri, Hormozgan
