= Hengam-e Qadim =

Hengam-e Qadim هنگام قديم
- Village
- Location within Iran
- Coordinates: 26°36′55″N 55°52′23″E
- Country: Iran
- Province: Hormozgan
- County: Qeshm
- Bakhsh: Shahab
- Rural District: Hengam

Population (2006)
  - Total: 48
- Time zone: UTC+3:30 (IRST)
  - Summer (DST): UTC+4:30 (IRDT)

Hengam-e Qadim (Persian: هنگام قديم, also Romanized as Hengām-e Qadīm; also known as Hengām-e Kohneh, Hengām-e Qadīd, Hengam Kohneh, and Khammāsī) is a village in Hengam Rural District, Shahab District, Qeshm County, Hormozgan province, Iran. At the 2006 census, its population was 48, in 12 families. The village is located on Hengam Island.
