= Chubeh Daraq =

Chubeh Daraq چوبه درق
- Village
- Location within Iran
- Coordinates: 38°54′26″N 46°39′42″E
- Country: Iran
- Province: East Azerbaijan
- County: Khoda Afarin
- Bakhsh: Minjavan
- Rural District: Minjavan-e Gharbi

Population (2006)
  - Total: 112
- Time zone: UTC+3:30 (IRST)
  - Summer (DST): UTC+4:30 (IRDT)

Chubeh Daraq (Persian: چوبه درق, also Romanized as Chūpeh Daraq; also known as Qal‘eh-ye Chapdaraq, Chapandara, Chūbeh Daraq Bālā, Chūbeh Daraq-e Bālā, and Chūbeh Daraq-e 'Olyā) is a village in Minjavan-e Gharbi Rural District, Minjavan District, Khoda Afarin County, East Azerbaijan province, Iran. At the 2006 census, its population was 112, in 31 families.
