= Qeshlaq-e Eshqali =

Qeshlaq-e Eshqali قشلاق عشقعلي
- Village
- Location within Iran
- Coordinates: 38°56′00″N 46°37′00″E
- Country: Iran
- Province: East Azerbaijan
- County: Khoda Afarin
- Bakhsh: Minjavan
- Rural District: Minjavan-e Gharbi

Population (2006)
  - Total: 66
- Time zone: UTC+3:30 (IRST)
  - Summer (DST): UTC+4:30 (IRDT)

Qeshlaq-e Eshqali (Persian: قشلاق عشقعلي, also Romanized as Qeshlāq-e ‘Eshq‘alī; also known as Shām Sharfeh) is a village in Minjavan-e Gharbi Rural District, Minjavan District, Khoda Afarin County, East Azerbaijan Province, Iran. At the 2006 census, its population was 66, in 12 families.
