= Buyduz =

Buyduz بويدوز
- Village
- Location within Iran
- Coordinates: 39°00′40″N 46°41′44″E
- Country: Iran
- Province: East Azerbaijan
- County: Khoda Afarin
- Bakhsh: Minjavan
- Rural District: Minjavan-e Gharbi

Population (2006)
  - Total: 147
- Time zone: UTC+3:30 (IRST)
  - Summer (DST): UTC+4:30 (IRDT)

Buyduz (Persian: بويدوز, also Romanized as Būydūz and Bū’īdūz; also known as Bū’īndūz) is a village in Minjavan-e Gharbi Rural District, Minjavan District, Khoda Afarin County, East Azerbaijan Province, Iran. At the 2006 census, its population was 147, in 30 families.
