= Replacement depot =

United States military term

Ground Forces Replacement System Ground Forces Reinforcement Command
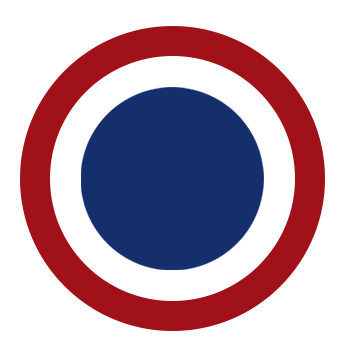
- Active: 1944-1945
- Country: United States
- Branch: United States Army
- Part of: European Theater of Operations, United States Army
- Garrison/HQ: Cheltenham, England; Le Mans, France

Commanders
- 24 October 1943 - 24 September 1944: BG Walter Layman
- 24 September 1944 - 27 January 1945: BG Henry J. Matchett
- 27 January 1945 - April 1945: MG Albert E. Brown

A replacement depot in United States military terminology is a unit containing reserves or replacements for large front-line formations, such as field armies. As such, the term refers to formations similar to, but larger than, march battalions in other countries. The slang term "repple depple" came into common use in the US Army during World War II.

Replacement depots were under the command of the Ground Forces Replacement System (GFRS) later renamed the Ground Force Reinforcement Command (GFRC) during World War II.

These depots were used by the US Army in the Pacific, North Africa, Italy, and Europe in World War II. They were efficient at continuously keeping fighting units at high numerical strength during prolonged combat when compared to the German system, but were found to be deleterious to morale as the men assigned from these large pools often had poor esprit de corps and were unfamiliar with the names, history, and traditions of the formations to which they were subsequently assigned. The handling of the replacements in a bulk, impersonal way by permanent depot staff tended to cause psychological trauma such that they were weakened by the experience. The Oxford English Dictionary notes, in a citation from The New York Times Magazine, 9 December 1945, that "repple depples, in short, are dreary places."

The depots of the GFRC reduced training in order to rush soldiers to the front lines. This meant soldiers would arrive at the front to their new units without weapons. It also meant that replacement officers were often only given 90 days of training and sent directly into combat.

In June of 1944, the GFRC introduced the policy of sending casualties back to their original units automatically. This greatly improved morale of the soldiers in hospitals and depots.

== Locations ==
=== World War I ===
1st Replacement Depot, St Aignan, France: support for the American Expeditionary Forces (AEF).

=== World War II ===
Location of replacement depots in Europe c. January 1945.

List of Replacement depot in European theatre
Depot	Location	Purpose(s)
Training Center No. 1	Shrivenham, England	Retraining of limited assignment men for new duty
2nd Replacement Depot	Thaon, France	US Seventh Army direct support depot
3rd Replacement Depot	Verviers, Belgium	US First Army direct support depot
9th Replacement Depot	Fontainebleau, France	Officer and officer candidate retraining center
10th Replacement Depot	Lichfield, England	Processing of hospital returnees
11th Replacement Depot	Givet, France	US First Army intermediate depot US Ninth Army intermediate depot
12th Replacement Depot	Tidworth, England	Theater reception depot Enlisted retraining center
14th Replacement Depot	Neufchâteau, France	US Third Army intermediate depot US Seventh Army intermediate depot
15th Replacement Depot	Le Havre, France	Theater reception depot
16th Replacement Depot	Compiègne, France	Enlisted retraining center
17th Replacement Depot	Angervilliers, France	US Third Army direct support depot
18th Replacement Depot	Tonges, Belgium	US Ninth Army direct support depot
19th Replacement Depot	Étampes, France	Processing of hospital returnees
51st Replacement Battalion	Charleville, France	US Fifteenth Army direct support depot
54th Replacement Battalion	Marseilles, France	Theater reception depot
6900th Provisional Depot	Verviers, Belgium	Field army intermediate depot Officer and officer candidate retraining center
6960th Provisional Depot	Coëtquidan, France	Enlisted retraining center

List of Replacement depot in Asian theatre
Depot	Location	date	Purpose(s)	Note
Hawaii Replacement Depot	Scofield Barracks	November 19, 1942 ~ November 1, 1943		
1st Replace Depot				
4th Replacement Depot	Australia; Camp Zama, Japan	November 5, 1942 ~ January 25, 1945		
5th Replace Depot				
6th Replace Depot	New Caledonia			
13rd Replace Depot	Oahu			
23rd Replace Depot	Saipan			
25th Replace Depot	Scofield Barracks			

=== After World War II ===
Location of replacement depots after World War II and the Cold War.

Depot	Location	Formation served	Note
8068th Replacement Depot	Beppu, Japan		
8069th Replacement Depot	Pusan, South Korea		
8091st Replacement Depot			
8609th Replacement Depot	Camp Drake, Sasebo, Japan		
