= Hengam Rural District =

Hengam Rural District or Hangam Rural District (Persian: دهستان هنگام) may refer to:

- Hengam Rural District (Qir and Karzin County)
- Hengam Rural District (Qeshm County)
