= Dulab, Hormozgan =

Village in Hormozgan province, Iran

Dulab Persian: دولاب
- Village
- Location within Iran
- Coordinates: 26°40′35″N 55°27′43″E
- Country: Iran
- Province: Hormozgan
- County: Qeshm
- District: Hara
- Rural District: Dulab

Population (2016)
  - Total: 1,453
- Time zone: UTC+3:30 (IRST)

Dulab (Persian: دولاب) (Note: Also romanized as Dūlāb; also known as Bandar-e Dūlāb) is a village in, and the capital of, Dulab Rural District of Hara District, Qeshm County, Hormozgan province, Iran.

== Demographics ==
=== Population ===
At the time of the 2006 National Census, the village's population was 1,125 in 243 households, when it was in Shahab District. The following census in 2011 counted 1,281 people in 305 households. The 2016 census measured the population of the village as 1,453 people in 404 households.

In 2017, the rural district was separated from the district in the formation of Hara District.
