= Qareh Quch-e Min Bashi =

Qareh Quch-e Min Bashi قره قوچ مين باشي
- Village
- Location within Iran
- Coordinates: 39°01′12″N 46°44′57″E
- Country: Iran
- Province: East Azerbaijan
- County: Khoda Afarin
- Bakhsh: Minjavan
- Rural District: Minjavan-e Gharbi

Population (2006)
  - Total: 26
- Time zone: UTC+3:30 (IRST)
  - Summer (DST): UTC+4:30 (IRDT)

Qareh Quch-e Min Bashi (Persian: قره قوچ مين باشي, also Romanized as Qareh Qūch-e Mīn Bāshī and Qarah Qūch-e Mīnbāshī; also known as Qarah Qūch-e ‘Olyā, Ghareh Ghooch Manbashi, and Karakhach Ashaghī) is a village in Minjavan-e Gharbi Rural District, Minjavan District, Khoda Afarin County, East Azerbaijan Province, Iran. At the 2006 census, its population was 26, in 5 families.
