= Kasidakari =

Indian embroidery art

Kashidakari (Note: Hindi: कशीदाकारी, romanized: kaśidākārī, Gurmukhi Punjabi: ਕਸ਼ੀਦਾਕਾਰੀ, romanized: kaśīdākārī, Shahmukhi Punjabi and Urdu: کَشِیدَہ کَارِی, romanized: kaśīda-kārī, Persian: کَشِیدَه‌کَارِی, romanized: kašīda-kārī) is an embroidery art associated with many parts of the northern Indian subcontinent (namely Kashmir, Bihar, Delhi, Chandigarh, Islamabad, Punjab, Haryana, Uttar Pradesh, Rajasthan and Himachal Pradesh).

== Name ==
Kashida is the local lingo for the embroidery. Kashidakari is the Persian, Hindustani (Hindi-Urdu) and Punjabi word for needlework. It is also known as kasidakari.

== Techniques and stitches ==
Various stitches are employed for Kashida work such as darning stitch, stem stitch, satin stitch and chain stitch. The base material for Kashida is cotton, wool or silk in a variety of colours like white, blue, yellow, purple, red, green and black. The stitches may vary with the material to be embroidered. Do-rukha (Note: Hindi: दोरुख़ा, romanized: dōruxā, Gurmukhi Punjabi: ਦੋਰੁਖ਼ਾ, romanized: dōruxā, Shahmukhi Punjabi and Urdu: دو‌رُخَا, romanized: dōruxā, Persian: دو‌‌رُخَا, romanized: du-ruxā) embroidery (Chamba Kashidakari) has characteristics of its own which differentiates it from other forms of embroidery in India.

=== Sozni ===
The Sozni (Note: Hindi: सोज़नी, romanized: sōzanī, Gurmukhi Punjabi: ਸੋਜ਼ਨੀ, romanized: sōzanī, Shahmukhi Punjabi, Persian and Urdu: سوزَنِی, romanized: sōzanī) stitch is used when uniformity is desired on both sides, like in choice. When the needle work is executed so neatly that the design is clearly visible on both sides it is known as Do-rukha.

=== Zalaqdozi ===
Zalaqdozi (Note: Hindi: ज़लक़दोज़ी, romanized: zalaqdōzī, Gurmukhi Punjabi: ਜ਼ਲਕ਼ਦੋਜ਼ੀ, romanized: zalaqdōzī, Shahmukhi Punjabi and Urdu: زَلَقْدوزِی, romanized: zalaqdōzī, Persian: زَلَق‌دوزِی, romanized: zalaq-dōzī) or Zalakdozi employs hook or aari to fill-in motifs with chain stitch. The chain stitch done with a hook is found on chogas (cloaks) and rugs with long and flowing designs.

=== Zari thread ===
Kashmiri couching using zari thread is a style of Kashida work in which a zari thread is laid on the fabric along a pattern and is held in place with another thread. In Kashmiri, Hindustani (Hindi-Urdu), Punjabi and Persian, the artisan who specializes in this craft is known as a tila-doz, (Note: Devanagari Kashmiri and Hindi: तिलादोज़, romanized: tilādōz, Gurmukhi Punjabi: ਤਿਲਾਦੋਜ਼, romanized: tilādōz, Shahmukhi Punjabi, Perso-Arabic Kashmiri and Urdu: طِلَا دوز, romanized: t̤ilā-dōz, Persian: کَشِیدَه‌کَارِی, romanized: kašīda-kārī, Persian: طِلَا‌دوز, romanized: ṭilā-dōz, lit. 'gold sewer') with tila (Arabic: طِلَاء, romanized: ṭilā') ultimately derived from Arabic and mediated thtough Persian.

== Use ==
To decorate costumes, pherans, shawls, handkerchief and various household items like bed covers, cushion covers, lampshades, bags and other accessories.

== See also ==
Chamba Rumal an embroidered handicraft that was once promoted under the patronage of the former rulers of Chamba kingdom.
