= Alajujeh =

Village in East Azerbaijan province, Iran

Alajujeh Persian: الاجوجه
- Village
- Location within Iran
- Coordinates: 38°57′33″N 46°40′33″E
- Country: Iran
- Province: East Azerbaijan
- County: Khoda Afarin
- District: Manjavan
- Rural District: Manjavan-e Gharbi

Population (2016)
  - Total: 230
- Time zone: UTC+3:30 (IRST)

Alajujeh (Persian: الاجوجه) (Note: Also romanized as Alājūjeh; also known as Ala Joojeh, Aladzhudzha, and Alajuja) is a village in Manjavan-e Gharbi Rural District of Manjavan District in Khoda Afarin County, East Azerbaijan province, Iran.

== Demographics ==
=== Population ===
At the time of the 2006 National Census, the village's population was 222 in 44 households, when it was in the former Khoda Afarin District of Kaleybar County. The following census in 2011 counted 232 people in 61 households, by which time the district had been separated from the county in the establishment of Khoda Afarin County. The rural district was transferred to the new Manjavan District. The 2016 census measured the population of the village as 230 people in 72 households.
