= Suza, Iran =

City in Hormozgan province, Iran

Suza Persian: سوزا
- City
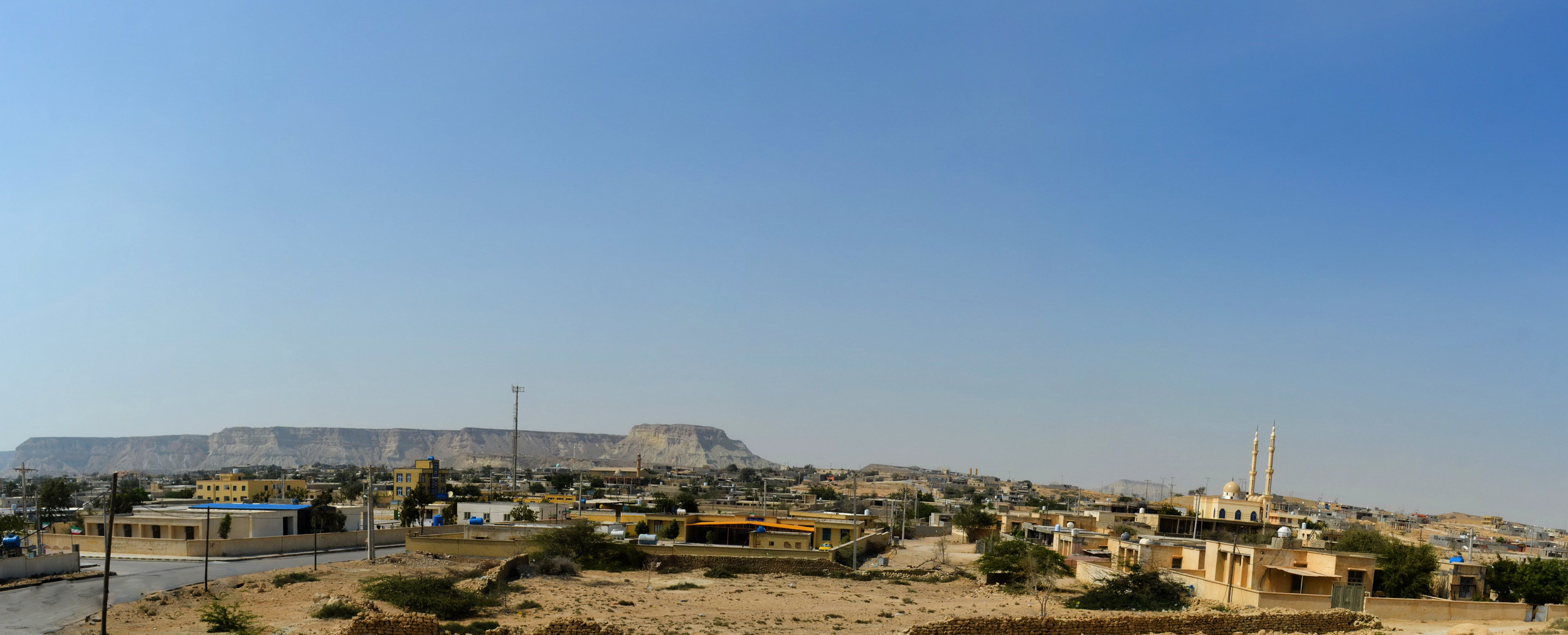
- Panoramic of Suza in 2013

- Location within Iran
- Coordinates: 26°46′48″N 56°03′45″E
- Country: Iran
- Province: Hormozgan
- County: Qeshm
- District: Shahab

Population (2016)
  - Total: 5,707
- Time zone: UTC+3:30 (IRST)

Suza (Persian: سوزا) (Note: Also romanized as Sooza and Sūzā; also known as Bandar-e Sūzā, Shūzeh, Sūreh, and Sūzeh) is a coastal city in, and the capital of, Shahab District of Qeshm County, Hormozgan province, Iran. It also serves as the administrative center for Suza Rural District.

== Demographics ==
=== Population ===
At the time of the 2006 National Census, the city's population was 4,480 in 1,138 households. The following census in 2011 counted 4,712 people in 1,138 households. The 2016 census measured the population of the city as 5,707 people in 1,539 households.
