= Riku, Hormozgan =

Riku ريكو
- Village
- Location within Iran
- Coordinates: 26°50′44″N 56°07′27″E
- Country: Iran
- Province: Hormozgan
- County: Qeshm
- Bakhsh: Shahab
- Rural District: Suza

Population (2006)
  - Total: 333
- Time zone: UTC+3:30 (IRST)
  - Summer (DST): UTC+4:30 (IRDT)

Riku (Persian: ريكو, also Romanized as Rīkū; also known as Bāghū, Rīgū, and Rīgū Jahānshāhī) is a village in Suza Rural District, Shahab District, Qeshm County, Hormozgan Province, Iran. At the 2006 census, its population was 333, in 63 families.
