= Ebrahim Sami =

Village in East Azerbaijan province, Iran

Ebrahim Sami Persian: ابراهيم سميع
- Village
- Location within Iran
- Coordinates: 38°57′15″N 46°40′08″E
- Country: Iran
- Province: East Azerbaijan
- County: Khoda Afarin
- District: Manjavan
- Rural District: Manjavan-e Gharbi

Population (2016)
  - Total: 382
- Time zone: UTC+3:30 (IRST)

Ebrahim Sami (Persian: ابراهيم سميع) (Note: Also romanized as Ebrāhīm Samī‘; also known as Ebrāhīm Sham‘alī, Ibragim-Sami, and Ibrāhīmsāmi) is a village in Manjavan-e Gharbi Rural District of Manjavan District in Khoda Afarin County, East Azerbaijan province, Iran.

== Demographics ==
=== Population ===
At the time of the 2006 National Census, the village's population was 434 in 87 households, in the former Khoda Afarin District of Kaleybar County. The following census in 2011 counted 447 people in 106 households, by which time the district had been separated from the county in the establishment of Khoda Afarin County. The rural district was transferred to the new Manjavan District. The 2016 census measured the village's population as 382 people in 116 households.
