= Tabl, Iran =

Village in Hormozgan province, Iran

Tabl Persian: طبل
- Village
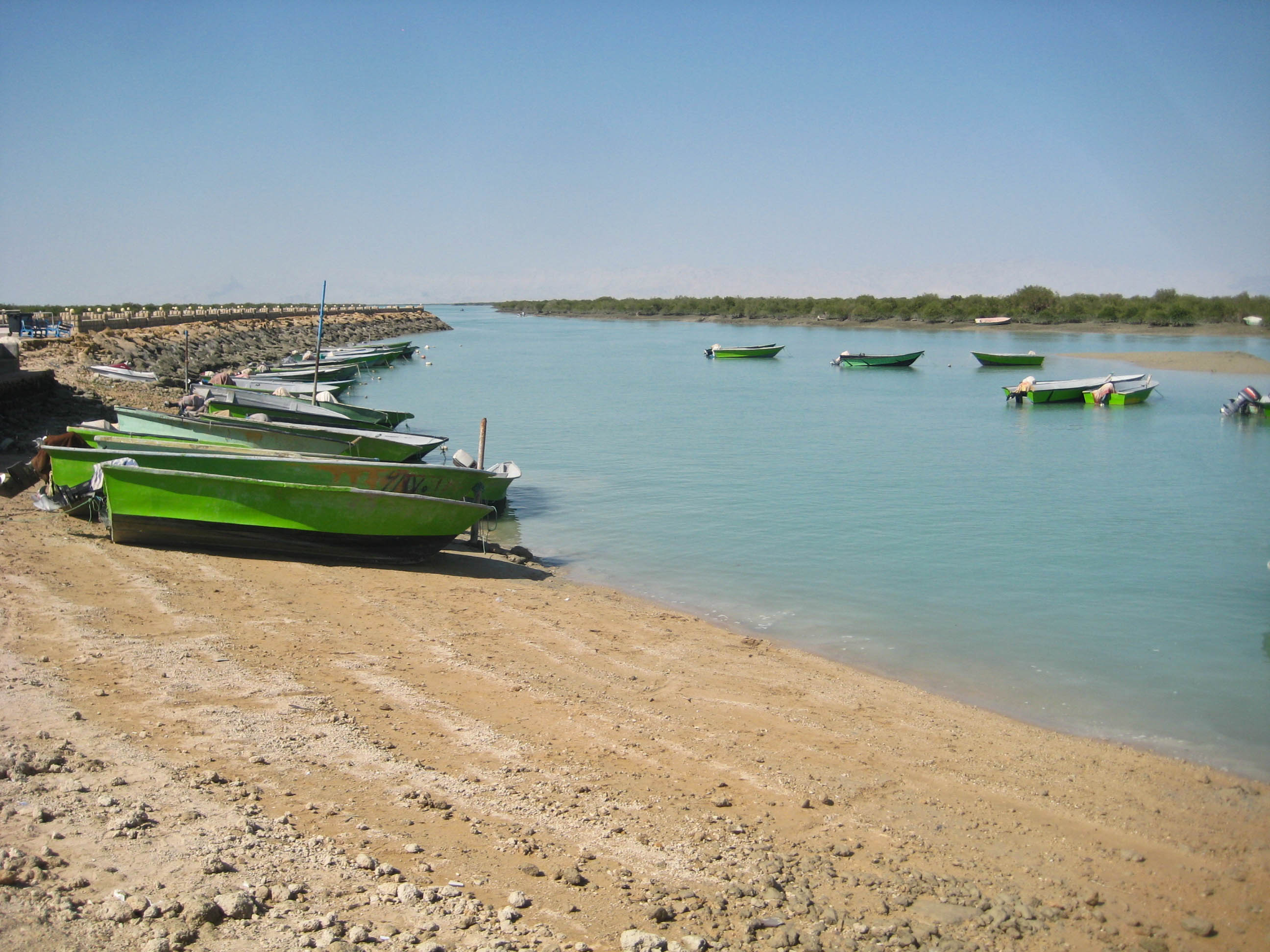
- Evening in Tabl Port

- Location within Iran
- Coordinates: 26°45′28″N 55°43′35″E
- Country: Iran
- Province: Hormozgan
- County: Qeshm
- District: Hara
- Rural District: Salakh

Population (2016)
  - Total: 4,069
- Time zone: UTC+3:30 (IRST)

Tabl (Persian: طبل) (Note: Also romanized as Ţabl; also known as Taul, Ţol, and Ţūl) is a village in Salakh Rural District of Hara District, Qeshm County, Hormozgan province, Iran, serving as capital of both the district and the rural district.

== Demographics ==
=== Population ===
At the time of the 2006 National Census, the village's population was 3,082 in 630 households, when it was in Shahab District. The following census in 2011 counted 3,355 people in 783 households. The 2016 census measured the population of the village as 4,069 people in 1,051 households. It was the most populous village in its rural district.

In 2017, the rural district was separated from the district in the formation of Hara District.
