= Portuguese–Safavid wars =

Series of wars in the 16th–17th century

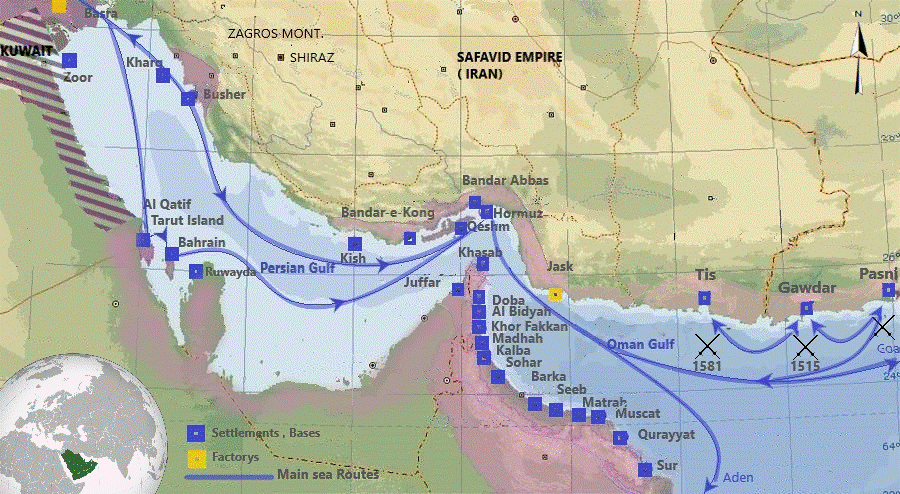
- Portuguese presence in the Persian Gulf (1507–1750)
Date	September 1507 – June/July 1728
Location	Persian Gulf and Indian Ocean

Belligerents
(Portugal) Portuguese Empire	Safavid Iran

Commanders and leaders
(Portugal) Manuel I; (Portugal) Afonso de Albuquerque; (Portugal) Rui Freire de Andrade	Abbas I; Imam Quli Khan; Allahverdi Khan

The Portuguese–Safavid wars or Persian-Portuguese wars (Persian: جنگ‌های ایران و پرتغال) were a series of conflicts between the Portuguese Empire and Safavid Iran from 1507 to 1728. The Portuguese were supported by the Kingdom of Hormuz, their vassal, while the Safavids had the help of the Kingdom of England.

During this era, Portugal established its rule for about more than a century in Hormuz and more than 80 years in Bahrain, capturing some other islands and ports such as Qeshm and Bandar Abbas. The conflict came to an end when the Persian shah Abbas I (r. 1588–1629), conquered Portuguese Bahrain, forcing them to war in the Persian Gulf.

In September 1507, the Portuguese Afonso de Albuquerque landed on the Hormuz. Portugal occupied Hormuz from 1515 to 1622. As a vassal of the Portuguese state, the Kingdom of Hormuz jointly participated in the 1521 invasion of Bahrain that ended Jabrid rule over the islands in the Persian Gulf.

After the Portuguese made several abortive attempts to seize control of Basra, the pasha asked for protection against the Safavid ruler Abbas I, from then on Portuguese stayed in the city and region as traders with a factory and as protector allied army. Later in 1622 the Safavid conquered Hormuz with the help of the English, and tried to expel the Portuguese from the rest of the Persian Gulf, with the exception of the Gulf of Oman. The Portuguese were for the next decades as allies of Afrasiyab, the pasha of Basra, against the Safavids who failed several times to conquer the city of Basra.

== Portuguese conquest of Hormuz (1507) ==
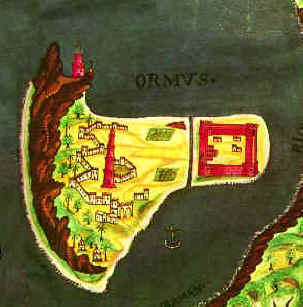
Portuguese map of Hormuz, 17th century

The capture of Hormuz was a result of a plan by Manuel I (r. 1495–1521) who in 1505 had resolved to thwart Muslim trade in the Indian Ocean by capturing Aden, to block trade through Alexandria; Hormuz, to block trade through Beirut; and Malacca to control trade with China. A fleet under Tristão da Cunha was sent to capture the Muslim fort on Socotra in order to control the entrance to the Red Sea; this was accomplished in 1507. The main part of the fleet then left for India, with a few ships remaining under Albuquerque.

Albuquerque disobeyed orders and left to capture the island of Hormuz. He obtained the submission of the local king to the king of Portugal, as well as the authorization to build a fort using local labor. He started to build a fort on 27 October 1507, and initially planned to man it with a garrison, but could not hold it because of local resistance and the defection to India of several of his Portuguese captains.

== Portuguese conquest of Bahrain (1521) ==
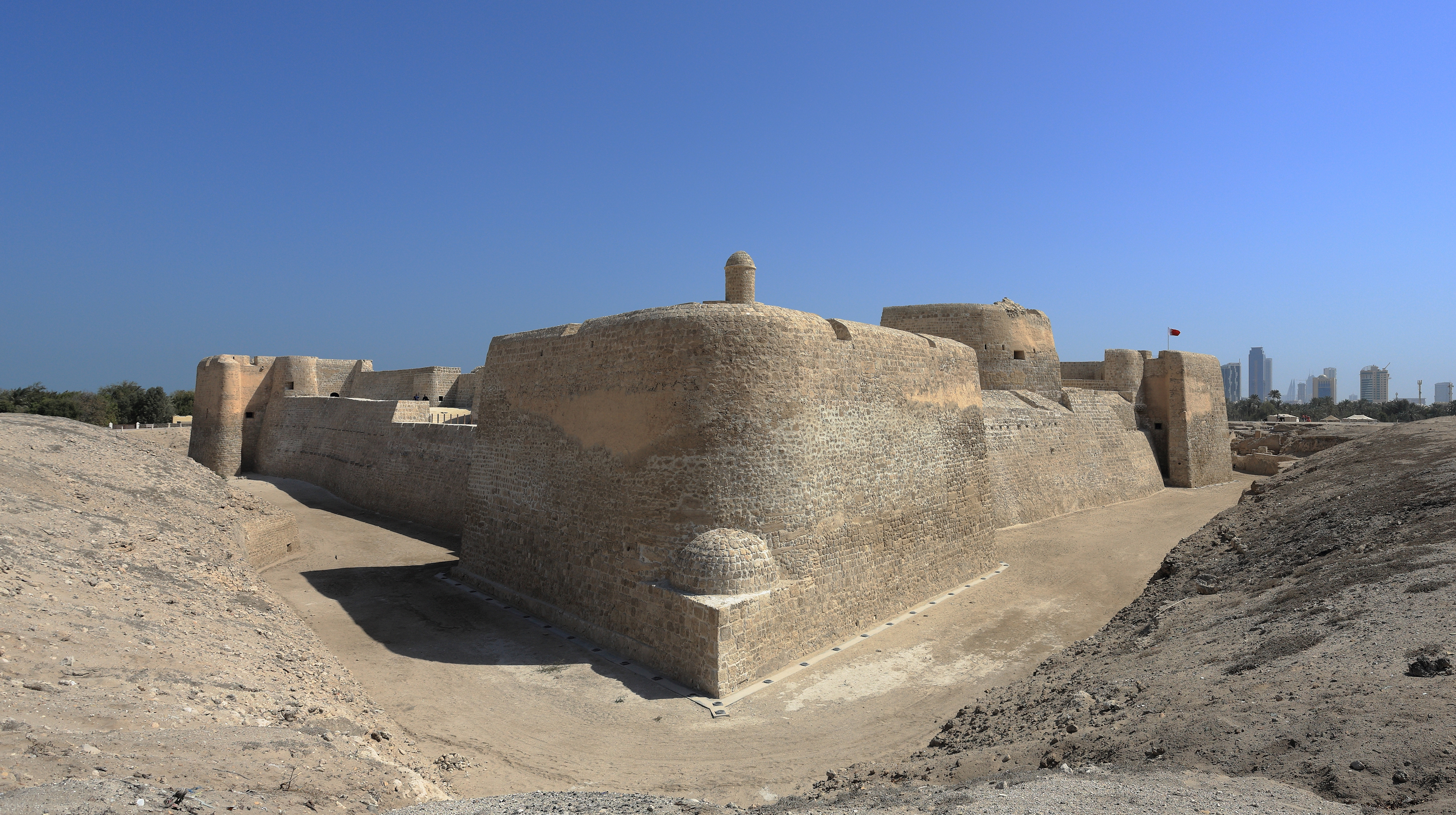
Portuguese fort in Bahrain

As a vassal of the Portuguese, the Kingdom of Hormuz jointly participated in the 1521 invasion of Bahrain that ended Jabrid rule of the Bahrain archipelago. The Jabrid ruler was nominally a vassal of Hormuz, but the Jabrid King, Muqrin ibn Zamil, had refused to pay the tribute Hormuz demanded, prompting the invasion under the command of the Portuguese conqueror, António Correia. In the fighting for Bahrain, most of the combat was carried out by Portuguese troops, while the Hormuzi admiral, Reis Xarafo, looked on. The Portuguese ruled Bahrain through a series of Hormuzi governors. However, the Sunni Hormuzi were not popular with Bahrain's Shia population which suffered religious disadvantages, prompting rebellion. In one case, the Hormuzi governor was crucified by rebels, and Portuguese rule came to an end in 1602 after the Hormuzi governor, who was a relative of the Hormuzi king, started executing members of Bahrain's leading families. In 1602 year, the governor of Bahrain Rukuneddin Masud asked for help to Allahverdi Khan, governor of province Fars of Savafid Empire, fearing the Fisrushah, the governor of Hormus, who was under the patronage of Portugal After an offer received, Allahverdi Khan captured Bahrain, on his own initiative, without informing Abbas I, but he correctly predicted that Abbas will agree to this

== Persian reconquest and Portuguese–Safavid War (1621–1630) ==
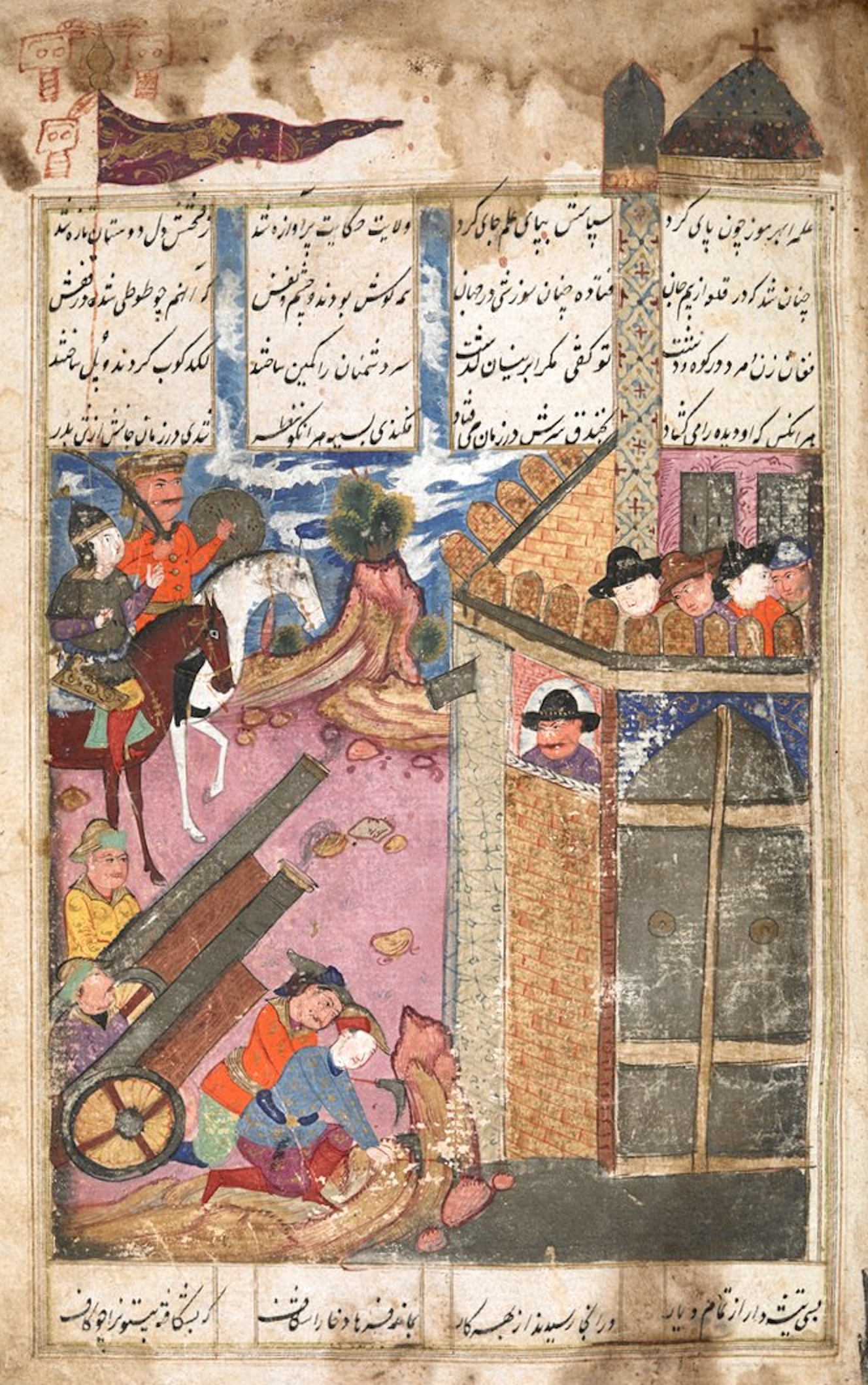
The Portuguese defend their fort on Hormuz from Persians led by Imam Quli Khan. From a Jarūnnāmeh by Qadrī. Isfahan style, dated 1697.

By the order of Abbas I (r. 1588–1629), in 1602, the Persian army under the command of Allahverdi Khan, managed to expel the Portuguese from Bahrain.

In 1612, the Portuguese Empire took the city of Gamrun and transliterated the name to Comorão. Almost two years later (in 1615), Comorão was taken by Abbas the Great after a naval battle with the Portuguese and renamed Bandar Abbas, or "Port of Abbas". In 1622, with the help of four English ships, Abbas retook Hormuz from the Portuguese.

=== Safavid invasions of Basra (1624) ===
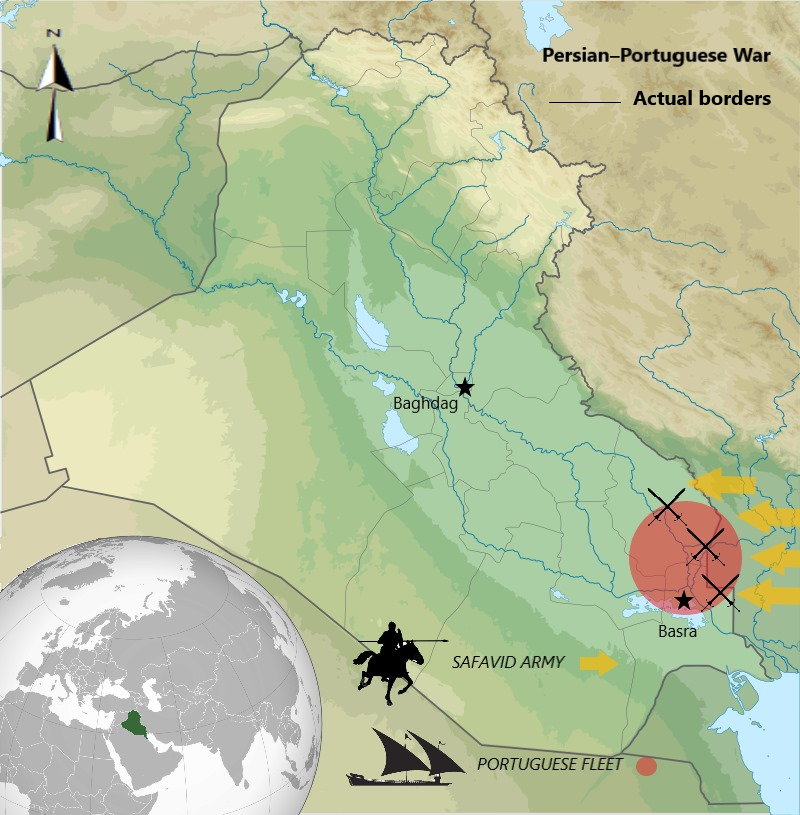
Battle of Eufrates in 1624, Portuguese protectorate of south Iraq and Portuguese territories of Kuwait

In 1523, the Portuguese commanded by António Tenreiro crossed from Aleppo to Basra. In 1550, the local Kingdom of Basra and tribal rulers relied on the Portuguese against the Ottomans, after which the Portuguese threatened several times to invoke an invasion and conquest of Basra. From 1595, the Portuguese acted as military protectors of Basra, and in 1624 they helped the Ottoman pasha of Basra to repel a Persian invasion with a fleet of galleys destroying the Safavid army.

Southern Iraq and the region of present-day Kuwait became a Portuguese protectorate when local lords, fearing the Persian invasion and Ottoman oppression, preferred the advantages of trade with the Portuguese that connected them to the rest of Asia from the important port of Basra.

In February 1624, between the Euphrates and Tigris Rivers, D. Diogo da Silveira, under the orders of Rui de Andrada, commanded the Portuguese who in battle defeated and removed the Safavid army from the region. The latter, in its attempt to capture the important port of Basra, commanded by the ruler of Shiraz, mobilized a large army of thousands of men to take over the province.

This army is located by the Portuguese fleet of D. Diogo da Silveira waiting in the middle of the river in the heart of present-day Iraq, the Portuguese commander, aware of the enemy's positions, defeats and force the withdrawal of Safavid troops on several fronts.

With the crossings blocked with fustas (small galleys) and galleys packed with cannons and infantry, any passage of the army was to be frustrated. In the suffocation points where the enemy's bulk and camps were located, they were destroyed by the bombardment of the Portuguese to the point that the casualties were too high, causing the enemy to retreat.

This unpredictable alignment with Turkish forces in the defense of the city and region of Basra had two advantages: on the one hand, the Persian distraction with matters beyond Hormuz weakened the defense of this fortress against the Portuguese; on the other hand, the strategic location of Basra was extremely convenient for the Portuguese intentions of continuing to benefit from the trade that sailed the waters of the Gulf.The Portuguese were granted a share of customs revenue and exemption from tolls. From approximately 1625 to 1668, Basra and the Delta marshes were in the hands of local chiefs independent of the Ottoman administration in Baghdad.

== Portuguese sack of Qeshm (1728) ==
In June/July 1728, a Portuguese flotilla sacked Qeshm, marking the last Portuguese military action in the Persian Gulf.

== See also ==
- Portuguese–Safavid relations
- Persian–Dutch War
- Naval history of Iran
- Battle off Hormuz (1625)

== Sources ==
- Cole, Juan R. I. (1987). "Rival Empires of Trade and Imami Shiism in Eastern Arabia, 1300-1800". International Journal of Middle East Studies. 19 (2): 177–203. doi:10.1017/S0020743800031834. JSTOR 163353. S2CID 162702326.
