= Uzan, Iran =

Village in East Azerbaijan province, Iran

Uzan Persian: اوزان
- Village
- Location within Iran
- Coordinates: 38°58′33″N 46°40′25″E
- Country: Iran
- Province: East Azerbaijan
- County: Khoda Afarin
- District: Manjavan
- Rural District: Manjavan-e Gharbi

Population (2016)
  - Total: 297
- Time zone: UTC+3:30 (IRST)

Uzan (Persian: اوزان) (Note: Also romanized as Oozan and Ūzān; also known as Ozan) is a village in Manjavan-e Gharbi Rural District of Manjavan District in Khoda Afarin County, East Azerbaijan province, Iran.

== Demographics ==
=== Population ===
At the time of the 2006 National Census, the village's population was 308 in 66 households, when it was in the former Khoda Afarin District of Kaleybar County. The following census in 2011 counted 301 people in 75 households, by which time the district had been separated from the county in the establishment of Khoda Afarin County. The rural district was transferred to the new Manjavan District. The 2016 census measured the population of the village as 297 people in 101 households.
