= Qareh Quch, East Azerbaijan =

Qareh Quch قره قوچ
- Village
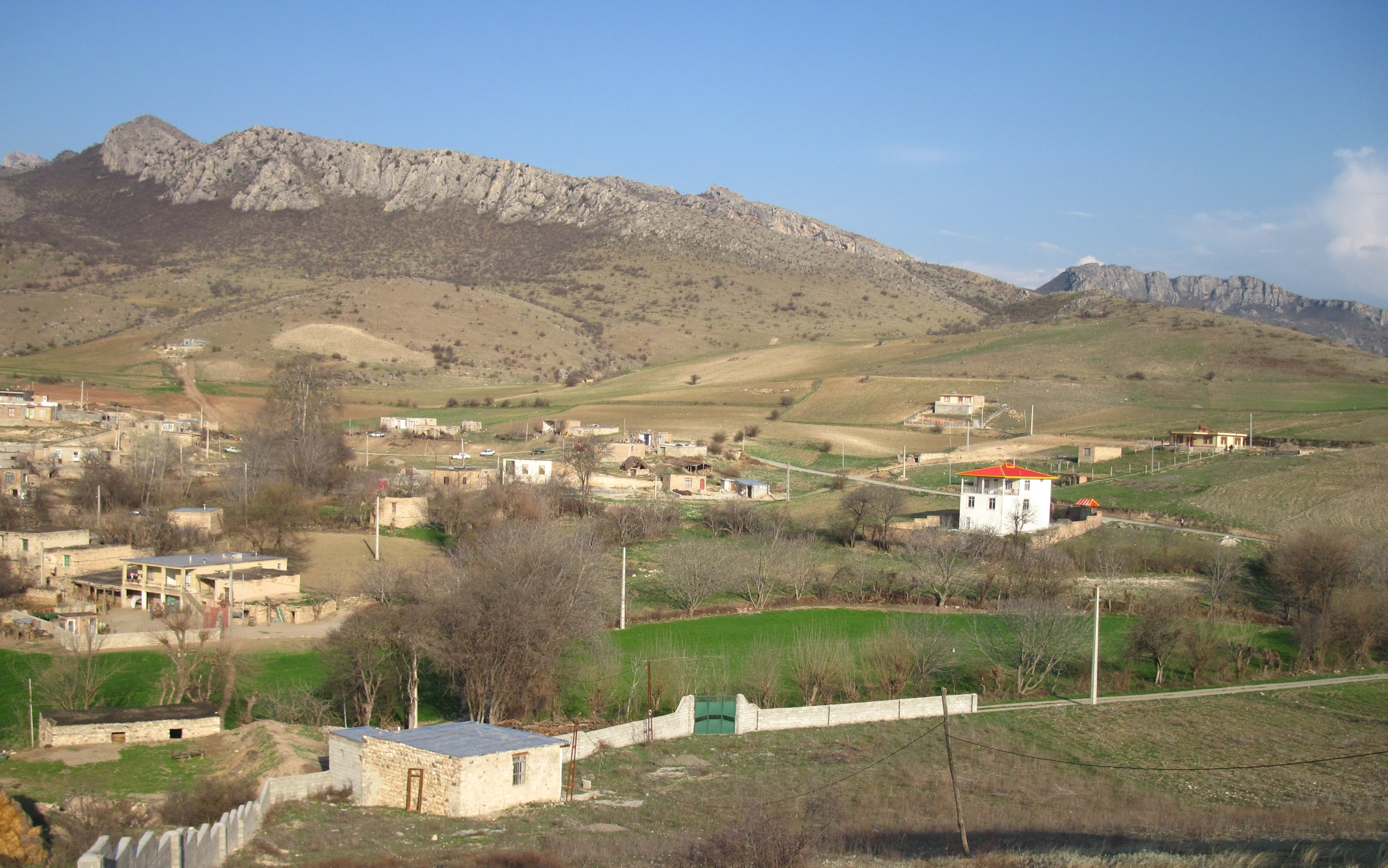
- A view of the village (2011)

- Location within Iran
- Coordinates: 39°00′00″N 46°43′43″E
- Country: Iran
- Province: East Azerbaijan
- County: Khoda Afarin
- Bakhsh: Minjavan
- Rural District: Minjavan-e Gharbi

Population (2006)
  - Total: 66
- Time zone: UTC+3:30 (IRST)
  - Summer (DST): UTC+4:30 (IRDT)

Qareh Quch (Persian: قره قوچ, also Romanized as Qareh Qūch; also known as Qareh Qūch-e Soflá, Ghareh Ghooch, Karakhach Yukāri, Karakhach Yukhari, Karakuch, and Qarehkhāch Yūkharī) is a village in Minjavan-e Gharbi Rural District, Minjavan District, Khoda Afarin County, East Azerbaijan Province, Iran. At the 2006 census, its population was 66, in 16 families.
