= Hengam-e Jadid =

Village in Hormozgan province, Iran

Hengam-e Jadid Persian: هنگام جديد
- Village
- Location within Iran
- Coordinates: 26°40′59″N 55°53′31″E
- Country: Iran
- Province: Hormozgan
- County: Qeshm
- District: Shahab
- Rural District: Hengam

Population (2016)
  - Total: 496
- Time zone: UTC+3:30 (IRST)

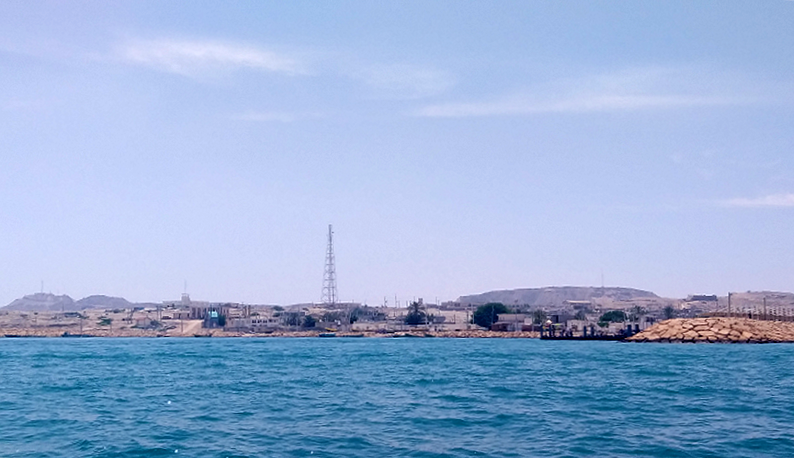

Hengam-e Jadid (Persian: هنگام جديد) (Note: Also romanized as Hangām-e Jadīd, Hengam Jadid, and Hengām-e Jadīd; also known as Bandar-e Hengām, Bandar-e Jadīd, Hangām, Hengām, Hengām-e Now, Henjām, and Hīnām Māshī) is a village in, and the capital of, Hengam Rural District of Shahab District, Qeshm County, Hormozgan province, Iran. The village is on Hengam Island.

== Demographics ==
=== Population ===
At the time of the 2006 National Census, the village's population was 400 in 95 households. The following census in 2011 counted 392 people in 105 households. The 2016 census measured the population of the village as 496 people in 138 households. It was the most populous village in its rural district.
