= Turkmen needlework =

Traditional art of embroidery in Turkmenistan and Iran

- An embroidered turkmen scarf.
- Type: Embroidery
- Material: Silk
- Production method: Needlework
- Place of origin: Iran and Turkmenistan
- Introduced: 9th–8th Centuries BC

Turkmen-style needlework art
- UNESCO Intangible Cultural Heritage
- Country: Iran, Turkmenistan
- Reference: 01876
- Region: Asia and the Pacific

Inscription history
- Inscription: 2022 (17th session)
- List: Representative

Turkmen-style needlework art, also known as "black needlework", is a decorative and functional form of needlework, specifically focused on intricate threadwork, used in the clothing of people of all genders and ages in Iran and Turkmenistan. The embroidery process in both countries begins with the preparation of fine silk threads, a technique that enhances their sheen. Traditionally, girls learn this craft from their mothers and grandmothers. In rural areas, the patterns used reflect the territorial identity of the women who create them, symbolizing love, friendship, nature, and strength. This embroidery is prominently featured in wedding attire, mourning garments, and cultural ceremonies, as well as in decorative elements of everyday clothing such as scarves, coats, trousers, shawls, and accessories.

== History ==
The Turkmen people have long been engaged in silk production, which is considered the primary material for embroidery. Women and girls traditionally embroidered their clothing using silk threads dyed with natural colors, a practice reflected in Turkmen women's songs and oral literature. Pictorial embroidery among the Turkmen dates back to the Scythian era and remained prevalent alongside other forms of needlework throughout different periods. The peak of this art form occurred during the Afsharid, Zand, and especially the Qajar dynasties, as evidenced by surviving examples from these eras.

== Geographical distribution ==
In Iran, this art is primarily practiced in the provinces of North Khorasan and Golestan. Most Turkmen communities reside in the counties of Bojnord and Raz and Jargalan, where embroidery is widely practiced among Turkmen women.

== Applications ==
Turkmen embroidery, also known as "black embroidery," was historically widely used in traditional Turkmen society for decorating men's, women's, and children's clothing, as well as curtains. However, today it is primarily seen in women's attire. Turkmens wear embroidered garments for various ceremonies, including religious and mourning rituals, as well as celebrations and festivities. The embroidery patterns and decorations vary depending on the occasion. Wedding and festive attire, particularly bridal dresses, feature intricate embroidery, showcasing remarkable beauty.

== Type and materials ==
Turkmen embroidery features a dense and finely stitched chain stitch, known in Turkmen as Sanjim. The designs primarily consist of geometric and symmetrical patterns, often created from memory without pre-drawn guides. The main materials used in Turkmen embroidery are thread and fabric.

== Global recognition ==
In December 2022, Turkmen embroidery was inscribed as the 20th element of Iran's intangible cultural heritage on UNESCO's global list.
