= Kalaleh-ye Sofla =

Village in East Azerbaijan province, Iran

Kalaleh-ye Sofla Persian: كلاله سفلي
- Village
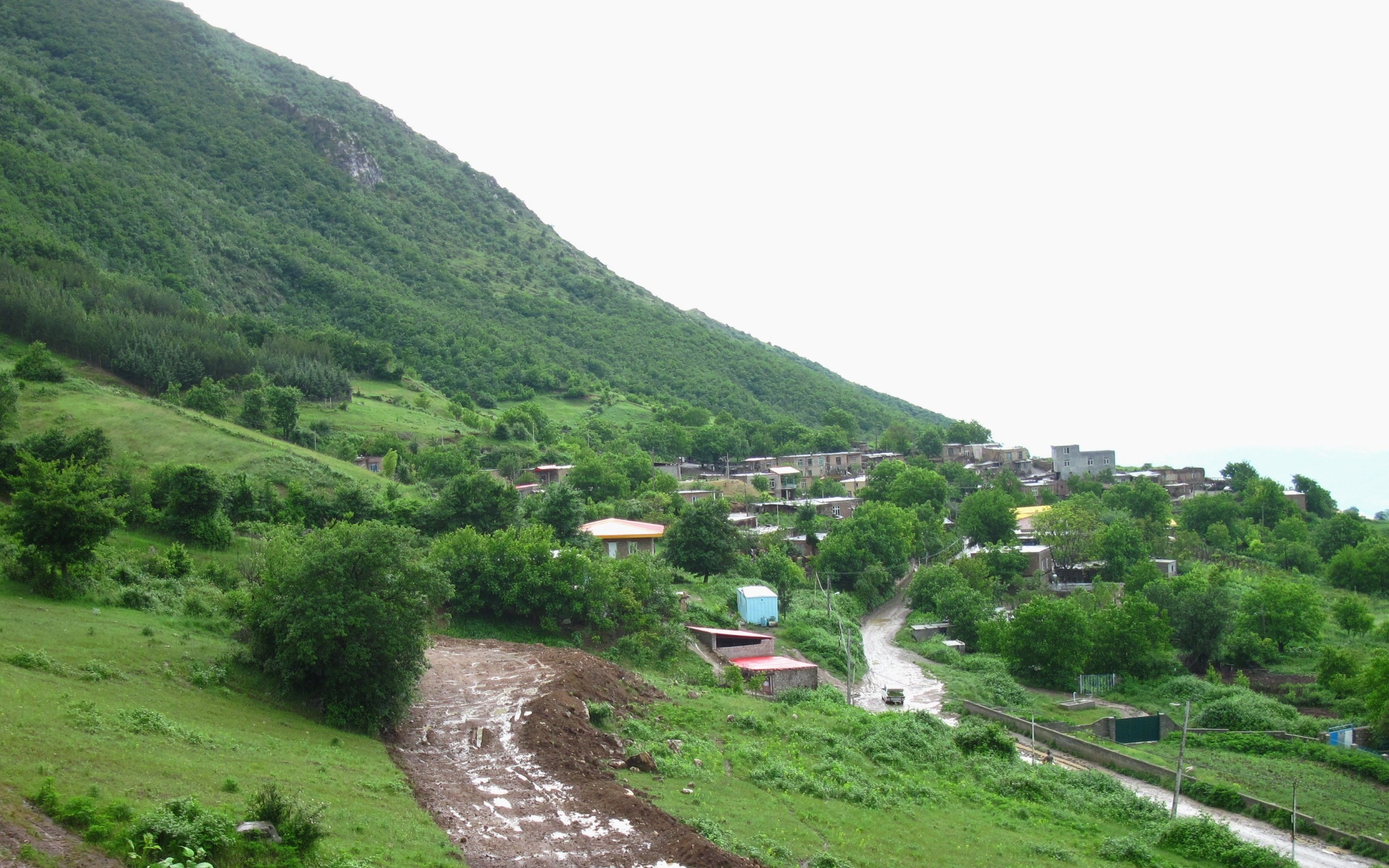
- Kalaleh-ye Sofla in July 2011

- Location within Iran
- Coordinates: 38°56′30″N 46°44′40″E
- Country: Iran
- Province: East Azerbaijan
- County: Khoda Afarin
- District: Manjavan
- Rural District: Manjavan-e Gharbi

Population (2016)
  - Total: 216
- Time zone: UTC+3:30 (IRST)

Kalaleh-ye Sofla (Persian: كلاله سفلي) (Note: Also romanized as Kalāleh-ye Soflá; also known as Galāleh Soflá, Kalāleh, Kalaleh-e Pā‘īn, Kalāleh-ye Pā’īn, Kalali, and Kialala) is a village in Manjavan-e Gharbi Rural District of Manjavan District in Khoda Afarin County, East Azerbaijan province, Iran.

== Demographics ==
=== Population ===
At the time of the 2006 National Census, the village's population was 201 in 37 households, when it was in the former Khoda Afarin District of Kaleybar County. The following census in 2011 counted 207 people in 54 households, by which time the district had been separated from the county in the establishment of Khoda Afarin County. The rural district was transferred to the new Manjavan District. The 2016 census measured the population of the village as 216 people in 65 households.
