= List of Intangible Cultural Heritage elements in Iran =

Location of Iran

The United Nations Educational, Scientific and Cultural Organization (UNESCO) defines intangible cultural heritage elements as non-physical traditions and practices performed by a people. As part of a country's cultural heritage, they include celebrations, festivals, performances, oral traditions, music, and the making of handicrafts. The term intangible cultural heritage is formally established by the Convention for the Safeguarding of the Intangible Cultural Heritage, which was drafted in 2003 and took effect in 2006. The inscription of new heritage elements on UNESCO's Intangible Cultural Heritage Lists for protection and safeguarding is determined by the Intergovernmental Committee for the Safeguarding of Intangible Cultural Heritage, an organization established by the Convention. Iran ratified the Convention on 23 March 2006. It has served on the Intangible Cultural Heritage Committee from 2010 to 2012.

National lists are required by the Convention for the further nomination of elements to the UNESCO lists.

== Intangible Cultural Heritage of Humanity ==
UNESCO's Intangible Cultural Heritage of Humanity consists of three lists: the Representative List of the Intangible Cultural Heritage of Humanity, the List of Intangible Cultural Heritage in Need of Urgent Safeguarding, and the Register of Good Safeguarding Practices. Iran has elements inscribed on all of the lists.

† Transnational element

=== Representative List ===
This list aims to represent the intangible cultural heritage of Uzbekistan worldwide and bring awareness to its significance.

Intangible Cultural Heritage elements recognized by UNESCO
Name	Media	Year	No.	Description
Radif of Iranian music		2009	00279	Radif is a collection of many old melodic figures preserved through many generations by oral tradition. It organizes the melodies in a number of different tonal spaces called dastgāh.
Ritual dramatic art of Ta'zīye		2010	00377	Ta'ziyeh is a ritual dramatic art that recounts religious events, historical and mythical stories and folk tales.
Pahlevani and Zoorkhanei rituals		2010	00378	Pahlevani and zourkhaneh rituals is a traditional system of athletics and a form of martial arts.
Music of the Bakhshis of Khorasan		2010	00381	In Khorasan one who plays the dutar, a traditional long-necked two-stringed lute, is known as a bakci (bakhshi).
Traditional skills of carpet weaving in Fars		2010	00382	Iranians enjoy a global reputation in carpet weaving, and the carpet weavers of Fars, located in the south-west of Iran, are among the most prominent.
Traditional skills of carpet weaving in Kashan		2010	00383	Long a centre for fine carpets, Kashan has almost one in three residents employed in carpet-making, with more than two-thirds of the carpet-makers being women.
Qālišuyān rituals of Mašhad-e Ardehāl in Kāšān		2012	000580	Qālišuyān rituals are practised to honour the memory of Soltān Ali, a holy figure among the people of Kāšān.
Flatbread making and sharing culture: Lavash, Katyrma, Jupka, Yufka † (Note: Shared with Azerbaijan, Kazakhstan, Kyrgyzstan, and Turkey.)	Pieces of lavash bread compiled in a wooden serving basket.	2016	01181	
Art of crafting and playing with Kamantcheh/Kamancha, a bowed string musical instrument † (Note: Shared with Azerbaijan.)		2017	01286	The kamancheh is a bowed string instrument.
Chogān, a horse-riding game accompanied by music and storytelling		2017	01282	Chogān is a sporting team game with horses that originated in ancient Persia.
Traditional skills of crafting and playing Dotār		2019	01492	
Pilgrimage to the St. Thaddeus Apostle Monastery + (Note: Shared with Armenia.)		2020	01571	
Art of miniature † (Note: Shared with Azerbaijan, Türkiye, and Iran.)		2020	01598	
Crafting and playing the Oud † (Note: Shared with Syria.)		2022	01867	
Turkmen-style needlework art † (Note: Shared with Turkmenistan)		2022	01876	
Yaldā/Chella + (Note: Shared with Afghanistan.)		2022	01877	
Sericulture and traditional production of silk for weaving † (Note: Shared with Afghanistan, Azerbaijan, Türkiye, Tajikistan, Turkmenistan, and Uzbekistan.)		2022	01890	
Sadeh/Sada celebration † (Note: Shared with Tajikistan.)		2023	01713	
Art of illumination: Təzhib/Tazhib/Zarhalkori/Tezhip/Naqqoshlik † (Note: Shared with Azerbaijan, Tajikistan, Turkey, and Uzbekistan.)		2023	01981	
Iftar/Eftari/Iftar/Iftor and its socio-cultural traditions † (Note: Shared with Azerbaijan, Türkiye, and Uzbekistan.)		2023	01984	
Art of crafting and playing rubab/rabab † (Note: Shared with Afghanistan, Iran, and Tajikistan.)		2024	02143	
Ceremony of Mehregan † (Note: Shared with Tajikistan.)		2024	02144	
Nawrouz, Novruz, Nowrouz, Nowrouz, Nawrouz, Nauryz, Nooruz, Nowruz, Navruz, Nevruz, Nowruz, Navruz † (Note: Shared with Afghanistan, Azerbaijan, India, Iraq, Kazakhstan, Kyrgyzstan, Mongolia, Pakistan, Tajikistan, Turkey, Turkmenistan, and Uzbekistan.)	Girl with torch on mountainside	2024	02097	
Ayeneh-Kari, the art of mirror-work in Persian architecture		2025	02319	Ayeneh-kari is a kind of Iranian interior decoration where artists assemble finely cut mirrors together in geometric, calligraphic, or foliage forms (inspired by flowers and other plants).

=== Need of Urgent Safeguarding ===
This list covers elements that are endangered and thus require appropriate safeguarding.

Endangered elements recognized by UNESCO
Name	Media	Year	No.	Description
Naqqāli, Iranian dramatic story-telling		2011	00535	Naqqāli is one of the oldest forms of the traditional Persian theatre. The Naqqāl is the performer and recounts stories in prose often accompanied by music, dance and decorative, painted scrolls.
Traditional skills of building and sailing Iranian Lenj boats in the Persian Gulf		2011	00534	Lenj vessels are traditionally hand-built and are used by inhabitants of the northern coast of the Persian Gulf for sea journeys, trading, fishing and pearl diving.

=== Register of Good Safeguarding Practices ===
This list accredits programs and projects that safeguard intangible cultural heritage and express the principles of the Convention.

Good Safeguarding Practices recognized by UNESCO
Name	Media	Year	No.	Description
National programme to safeguard the traditional art of calligraphy in Iran	A Chalipa, or panel, from 1598 CE, which features Persian calligraphy in the Nastaliq script and flowers of various colors and shapes.	2021	01716	

== See also ==
- List of World Heritage Sites in Iran
- Culture of Iran
- Tourism in Iran
