= Chahu Golzar =

Chahu Golzar چاهوگلزار
- Village
- Location within Iran
- Coordinates: 27°42′11″N 56°25′35″E
- Country: Iran
- Province: Hormozgan
- County: Hajjiabad
- Bakhsh: Central
- Rural District: Tarom

Population (2006)
  - Total: 34
- Time zone: UTC+3:30 (IRST)
  - Summer (DST): UTC+4:30 (IRDT)

Chahu Golzar (Persian: چاهوگلزار, also Romanized as Chāhū Golzār; also known as Chāhū) is a village in Tarom Rural District, in the Central District of Hajjiabad County, Hormozgan Province, Iran. At the 2006 census, its population was 34, in 8 families.
