= Rigu, Bandar Abbas =

Rigu ريگو
- Village
- Location within Iran
- Coordinates: 27°20′29″N 56°41′27″E
- Country: Iran
- Province: Hormozgan
- County: Bandar Abbas
- Bakhsh: Qaleh Qazi
- Rural District: Qaleh Qazi

Population (2006)
  - Total: 44
- Time zone: UTC+3:30 (IRST)
  - Summer (DST): UTC+4:30 (IRDT)

Rigu (Persian: ريگو, also Romanized as Rīgū and Reygū) is a village in Qaleh Qazi Rural District, Qaleh Qazi District, Bandar Abbas County, Hormozgan Province, Iran. At the 2006 census, its population was 44, in 8 families.
