= Dulab-e Karanlu =

Dulab-e Karanlu دولاب كرانلو
- Village
- Location within Iran
- Coordinates: 38°56′00″N 46°39′00″E
- Country: Iran
- Province: East Azerbaijan
- County: Khoda Afarin
- Bakhsh: Minjavan
- Rural District: Minjavan-e Gharbi

Population (2006)
  - Total: 181
- Time zone: UTC+3:30 (IRST)
  - Summer (DST): UTC+4:30 (IRDT)

Dulab-e Karanlu (Persian: دولاب كرانلو, also Romanized as Dūlāb-e Karānlū; also known as Dūlāb-e Kavānlū) is a village in Minjavan-e Gharbi Rural District, Minjavan District, Khoda Afarin County, East Azerbaijan Province, Iran. At the 2006 census, its population was 181, in 40 families.
