= Sarkuh-e Shahid Deli Bajak =

Sarkuh-e Shahid Deli Bajak سركوه شهيددلي بجك
- Village
- Country: Iran
- Province: Kohgiluyeh and Boyer-Ahmad
- County: Dana
- Bakhsh: Kabgian
- Rural District: Chenar

Population (2006)
  - Total: 25
- Time zone: UTC+3:30 (IRST)
  - Summer (DST): UTC+4:30 (IRDT)

Sarkuh-e Shahid Deli Bajak (Persian: سركوه شهيددلي بجك, also Romanized as Sarkūh-e Shahīd Delī Bajak) is a village in Chenar Rural District, Kabgian District, Dana County, Kohgiluyeh and Boyer-Ahmad Province, Iran. At the 2006 census, its population was 25, in 6 families.
