= Kalaleh-ye Olya =

Village in East Azerbaijan province, Iran

Kalaleh-ye Olya Persian: كلاله عليا
- Village
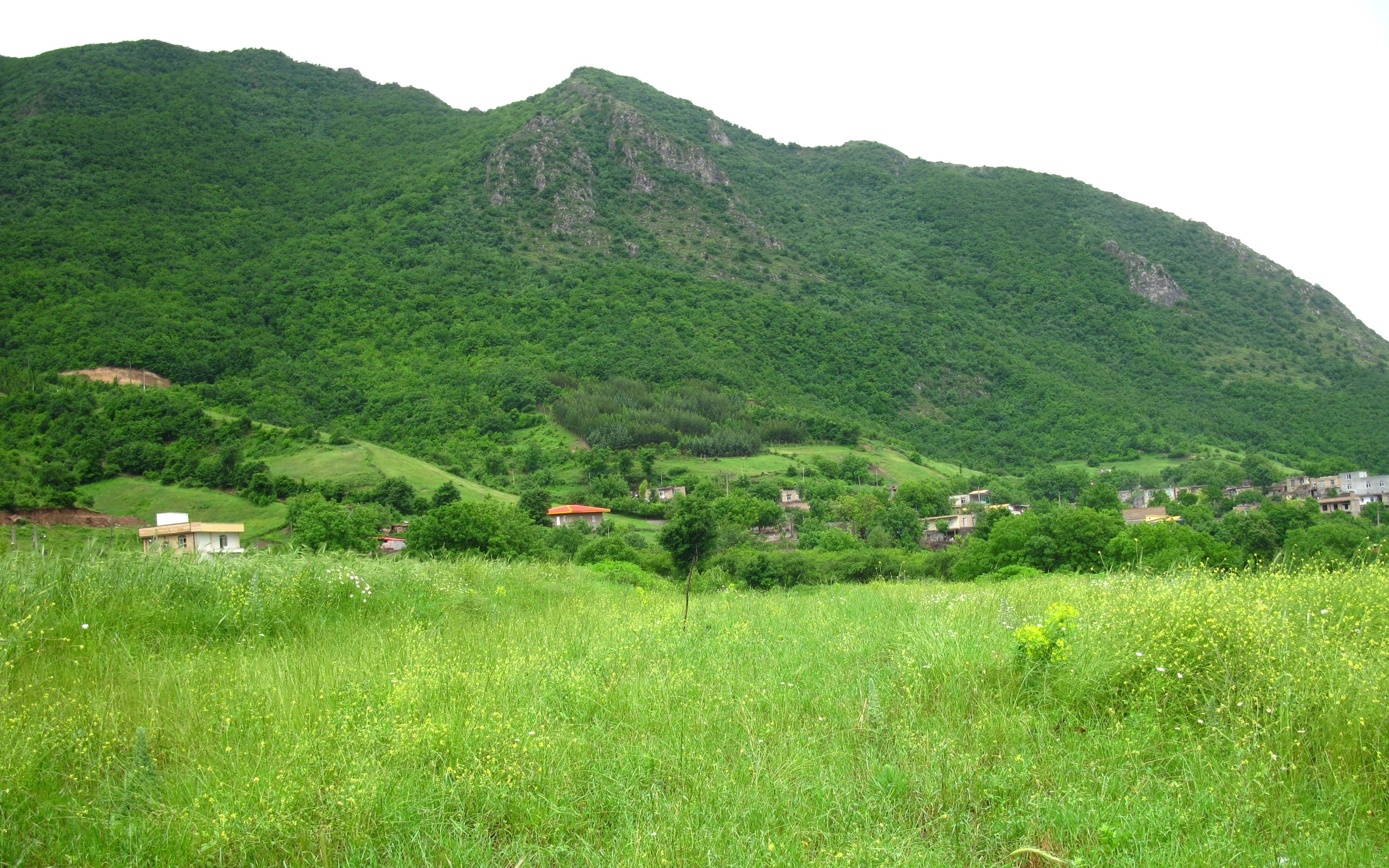
- Kalaleh-ye Olya in July 2011

- Location within Iran
- Coordinates: 38°56′33″N 46°45′31″E
- Country: Iran
- Province: East Azerbaijan
- County: Khoda Afarin
- District: Manjavan
- Rural District: Manjavan-e Gharbi

Population (2016)
  - Total: 211
- Time zone: UTC+3:30 (IRST)

Kalaleh-ye Olya (Persian: كلاله عليا) (Note: Also romanized as Kalaleh Olya and Kalāleh-ye ‘Olyā; also known as Kalāleh-ye Bālā) is a village in Manjavan-e Gharbi Rural District of Manjavan District in Khoda Afarin County, East Azerbaijan province, Iran.

== Demographics ==
=== Population ===
At the time of the 2006 National Census, the village's population was 198 in 43 households, when it was in the former Khoda Afarin District of Kaleybar County. The following census in 2011 counted 188 people in 45 households, by which time the district had been separated from the county in the establishment of Khoda Afarin County. The rural district was transferred to the new Manjavan District. The 2016 census measured the population of the village as 211 people in 66 households.
