= Riku, Savadkuh =

Riku ريكو
- village
- Interactive map of Riku
- Coordinates: 36°9′14.8″N 52°42′13.9″E
- Country: Iran
- Province: Mazandaran
- County: North Savadkuh
- Rural District: Lafur

Population (2016)
  - Total: 73
- Time zone: UTC+3:30 (IRST)

Riku (Persian: ريكو, also Romanized as Rīkū) is a village in Lafur Rural District, North Savadkuh County, Mazandaran Province, Iran. At the 2016 census, its population was 73, in 26 families. Up from 54 in 2006.
