= Dulab, Kahnuj =

Dulab دولاب
- Village
- Location within Iran
- Coordinates: 27°37′22″N 57°38′32″E
- Country: Iran
- Province: Kerman
- County: Kahnuj
- Bakhsh: Central
- Rural District: Deh Kahan

Population (2006)
  - Total: 237
- Time zone: UTC+3:30 (IRST)
  - Summer (DST): UTC+4:30 (IRDT)

Dulab (Persian: دولاب, also Romanized as Dūlāb) is a village in Deh Kahan Rural District, Central District, Kahnuj County, Kerman Province, Iran. At the 2006 census, its population was 237, in 47 families.
