= Chahu, Bandar Abbas =

Chahu چاهو
- Village
- Location within Iran
- Coordinates: 27°14′27″N 56°03′52″E
- Country: Iran
- Province: Hormozgan
- County: Bandar Abbas
- Bakhsh: Central
- Rural District: Tazian

Population (2006)
  - Total: 959
- Time zone: UTC+3:30 (IRST)
  - Summer (DST): UTC+4:30 (IRDT)

Chahu (Persian: چاهو, also Romanized as Chāhū; also known as Chahoo Isin) is a village in Tazian Rural District, in the Central District of Bandar Abbas County, Hormozgan Province, Iran. At the 2006 census, its population was 959, in 203 families.
