= Dulab-e Talkh =

Dulab-e Talkh دولاب تلخ
- Village
- Location within Iran
- Coordinates: 31°13′09″N 50°29′10″E
- Country: Iran
- Province: Kohgiluyeh and Boyer-Ahmad
- County: Kohgiluyeh
- Bakhsh: Charusa
- Rural District: Tayebi-ye Sarhadi-ye Gharbi

Population (2006)
  - Total: 92
- Time zone: UTC+3:30 (IRST)
  - Summer (DST): UTC+4:30 (IRDT)

Dulab-e Talkh (Persian: دولاب تلخ, also Romanized as Dūlāb-e Talkh; also known as Dūlāb) is a village in Tayebi-ye Sarhadi-ye Gharbi Rural District, Charusa District, Kohgiluyeh County, Kohgiluyeh and Boyer-Ahmad Province, Iran. At the 2006 census, its population was 92, in 17 families.
