= Chahu Genow-e Pain =

Chahu Genow-e Pain چاهوگنوپائين
- village
- Location within Iran
- Coordinates: 27°20′44″N 56°11′00″E
- Country: Iran
- Province: Hormozgan
- County: Bandar Abbas
- Bakhsh: Central
- Rural District: Tazian

Population (2006)
  - Total: 93
- Time zone: UTC+3:30 (IRST)
  - Summer (DST): UTC+4:30 (IRDT)

Chahu Genow-e Pain (Persian: چاهوگنوپائين, also Romanized as Chāhū Genow-e Pā'īn; also known as Poshteh-ye Mowlā) is a village in Tazian Rural District, in the Central District of Bandar Abbas County, Hormozgan Province, Iran. At the 2006 census, its population was 93, in 20 families.
