= Dulab-e Bala =

Dulab-e Bala دولاب بالا
- Village
- Location within Iran
- Coordinates: 29°42′30″N 53°22′22″E
- Country: Iran
- Province: Fars
- County: Arsanjan
- Bakhsh: Central
- Rural District: Shurab

Population (2006)
  - Total: 69
- Time zone: UTC+3:30 (IRST)
  - Summer (DST): UTC+4:30 (IRDT)

Dulab-e Bala (Persian: دولاب بالا, also Romanized as Dūlāb-e Bālā; also known as Dūlāb) is a village in Shurab Rural District, in the Central District of Arsanjan County, Fars province, Iran. At the 2006 census, its population was 69, in 13 families.
