= Dulehbi =

Dulehbi دوله بي
- Village
- Location within Iran
- Coordinates: 36°05′24″N 45°24′32″E
- Country: Iran
- Province: West Azerbaijan
- County: Sardasht
- Bakhsh: Central
- Rural District: Baryaji

Population (2006)
  - Total: 88
- Time zone: UTC+3:30 (IRST)
  - Summer (DST): UTC+4:30 (IRDT)

Dulehbi (Persian: دوله بي, also Romanized as Dūlehbī; also known as Dūlābī) is a village in Baryaji Rural District, in the Central District of Sardasht County, West Azerbaijan Province, Iran. At the 2006 census, its population was 88, in 17 families.
