= Chahuiyeh, Zarand =

Chahuiyeh چاهوييه
- Village
- Location within Iran
- Coordinates: 30°43′25″N 56°23′04″E
- Country: Iran
- Province: Kerman
- County: Zarand
- Bakhsh: Central
- Rural District: Jorjafak

Population (2006)
  - Total: 19
- Time zone: UTC+3:30 (IRST)
  - Summer (DST): UTC+4:30 (IRDT)

Chahuiyeh (Persian: چاهوييه, also Romanized as Chāhūīyeh and Chāhūyeh; also known as Pangū‘īyeh) is a village in Jorjafak Rural District, in the Central District of Zarand County, Kerman Province, Iran. At the 2006 census, its population was 19, in 6 families.
