= Chahu, Khamir =

Chahu چاهو
- Village
- Location within Iran
- Coordinates: 27°27′21″N 55°38′05″E
- Country: Iran
- Province: Hormozgan
- County: Khamir
- Bakhsh: Ruydar
- Rural District: Rudbar

Population (2006)
  - Total: 38
- Time zone: UTC+3:30 (IRST)
  - Summer (DST): UTC+4:30 (IRDT)

Chahu (Persian: چاهو, also Romanized as Chāhū) is a village in Rudbar Rural District, Ruydar District, Khamir County, Hormozgan Province, Iran. At the 2006 census, its population was 38, in 6 families.
