= Needlework =

Craft of creating or decorating objects using needle

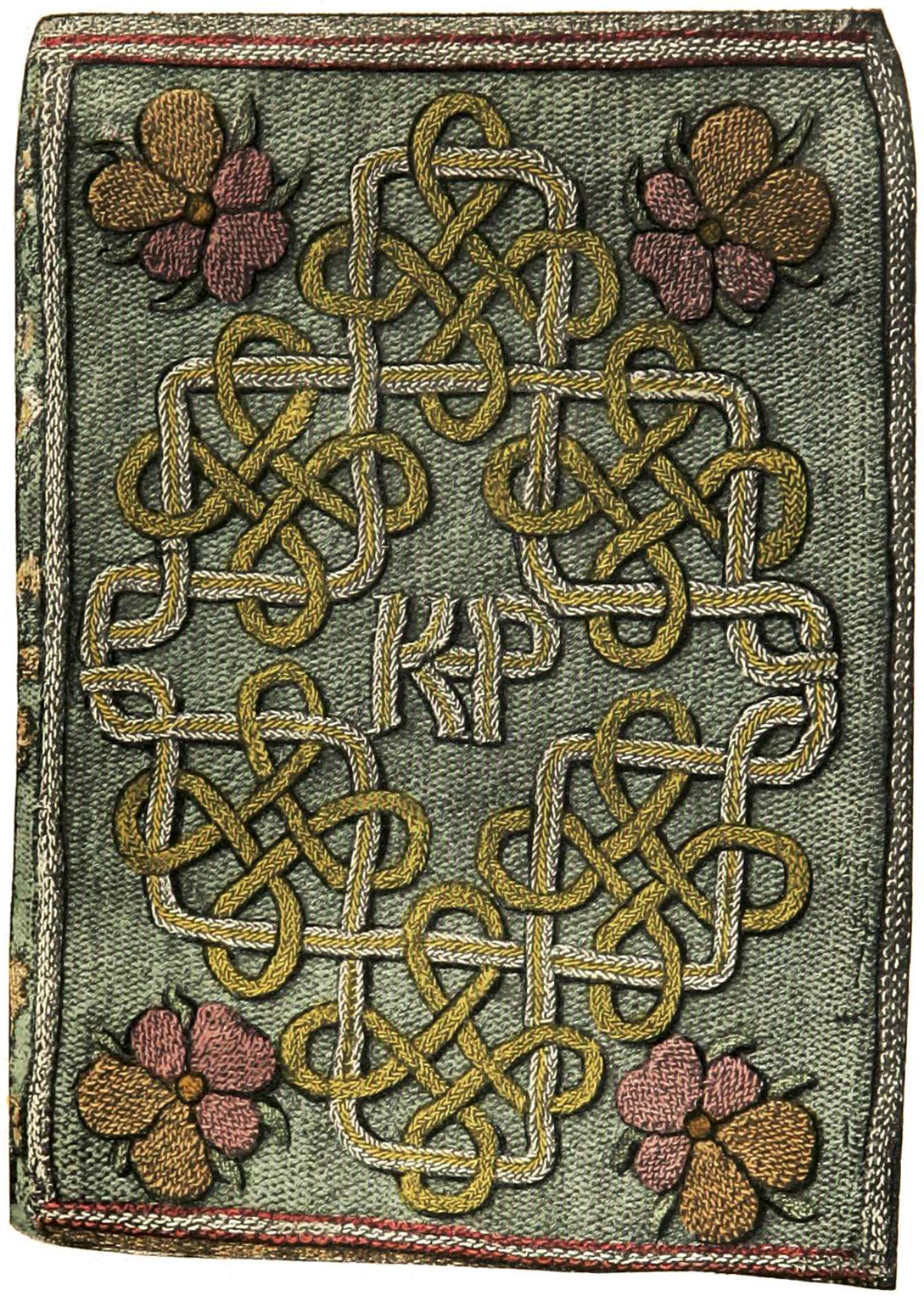
Embroidered book cover made by Elizabeth I at the age of 11, presented to Katherine Parr

Needlework refers to decorative sewing and other textile handicrafts that involve the use of a needle. Needlework may also include related textile crafts like crochet (which uses a hook), or tatting (which uses a shuttle).

Similar abilities often transfer well between different varieties of needlework, such as fine motor skill and knowledge of textile fibers. Some of the same tools may be used in several different varieties of needlework.

== Historical background ==
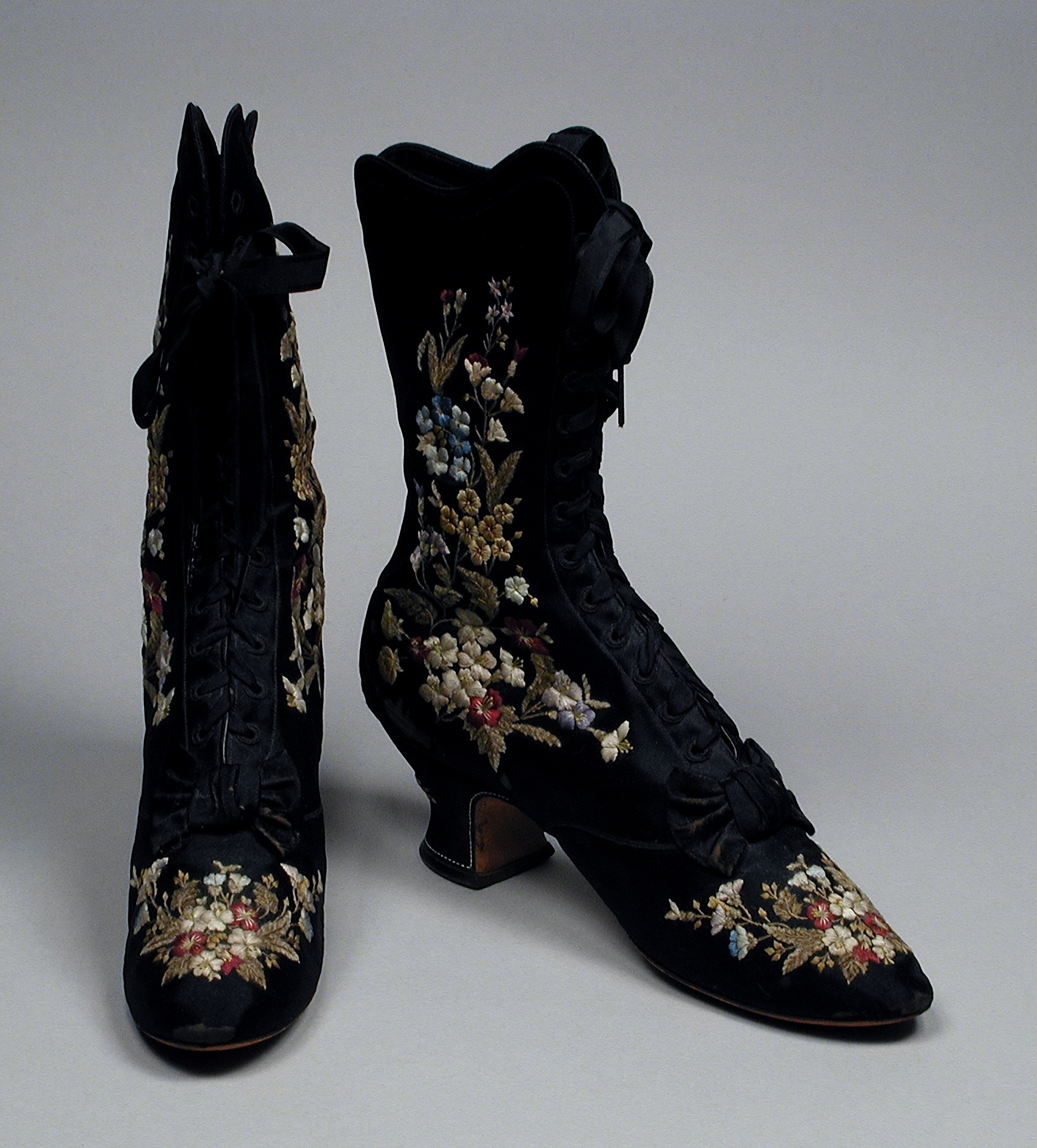
Embroidered boots, 1885

During the Italian Renaissance, needlework products were used to demonstrate the feminine ideal within the domestic sphere. Young women of all classes learned various types of embroidery, sewing, weaving, and quilting for their respective purposes. Those of lower economic status focused on practical sewing skills for housework, while those of higher economic status could afford to invest in more decorative needlework, such as tapestries. Common themes presented in these works included religious narratives, especially Biblical tales, although scenes from classical Greek and Roman mythos were depicted as well. Outside of narrative needlework, motifs and patterns that reflected the natural world were popular, alongside the introduction of the Islamic arabesque design to Renaissance Italy. Its interlocking knots and foliage shapes were used among needleworkers and painters alike, spread across countries through pattern books. Islamic arabesques particularly found a market through its implementation into Venetian lace. The production of needlework during the Renaissance was mostly done by women. Notable of this era was the use of band samplers, on which long rows of stitches were practiced. The two most common type of stitches were tent and cross stitches.

Needlework was an important fact of women's identity during the Victorian age, including embroidery, netting, knitting, crochet, and Berlin wool work. A growing middle class had more leisure time than ever before; printed materials offered homemakers thousands of patterns. Women were still limited to roles in the household, and under the standards of the time a woman working on needle work while entertaining the parlor was considered beautiful. According to one publication from 1843: "Never is beauty and feminine grace so attractive as, when engaged in the honorable discharge of household duties, and domestic cares."

Fancy work was distinguished from plain sewing and it was a mark of a prosperous and well-managed home to display handmade needlework. While plain sewing was often handed over to servants, even in middle class households, fancy work would often be done while entertaining guests, in the afternoons, evenings, or on Sundays. The types of goods that could be decorated with needlework techniques was limited only by the imagination: knitted boots, embroidered book covers, footstools, lampshades, sofa cushions, fans and on and on.

== Types ==
- Appliqué
- Bead weaving: loom and off-loom
- Braiding and tassel making
- Crochet
- Embroidery
- Knitting
- Lace-making/Needle lace
- Lucet
- Macramé
- Needlepoint
- Quilting
- Sewing
- Tapestry
- Tatting

== See also ==
- Royal School of Needlework
- Kasidakari
- Chinese needlework
- Turkmen needlework
- Ukrainian needlework
- Balochi needlework
- Korean embroidery
- Sindhi embroidery
- Suzani
