= Dulab, Kurdistan =

Dulab دولاب
- village
- Location within Iran
- Coordinates: 35°02′42″N 46°50′54″E
- Country: Iran
- Province: Kurdistan
- County: Kamyaran
- Bakhsh: Muchesh
- Rural District: Avalan
- Elevation: 954 m (3,130 ft)

Population (2006)
  - Total: 609
- Time zone: UTC+3:30 (IRST)
  - Summer (DST): UTC+4:30 (IRDT)

Dulab (Persian: دولاب, also Romanized as Dūlāb; also known as Dūrāb and Dūrūb) is a village in Avalan Rural District, Muchesh District, Kamyaran County, Kurdistan province, Iran. At the 2006 census, its population was 609, in 174 families. The altitude of the village is 954 meters. The village is populated by Kurds.
