= Hara District =

District in Hormozgan province, Iran

Hara District Persian: بخش حرا
- District
- Location within Iran
- Coordinates: 26°42′N 55°34′E
- Country: Iran
- Province: Hormozgan
- County: Qeshm
- Capital: Tabl
- Time zone: UTC+3:30 (IRST)

Hara District (Persian: بخش حرا) is in Qeshm County, Hormozgan province, Iran. Its capital is the village of Tabl, whose population at the time of the 2016 National Census was 4,069 people in 1,051 households.

== History ==
In 2017, Dulab and Salakh Rural Districts were separated from Shahab District in the formation of Hara District.

== Demographics ==
=== Administrative divisions ===
Hara District
Administrative Divisions
Dulab RD
Salakh RD
RD = Rural District
