= Dulab-e Shirin =

Dulab-e Shirin دولاب شيرين
- Village
- Location within Iran
- Coordinates: 31°12′58″N 50°28′57″E
- Country: Iran
- Province: Kohgiluyeh and Boyer-Ahmad
- County: Kohgiluyeh
- Bakhsh: Charusa
- Rural District: Tayebi-ye Sarhadi-ye Gharbi

Population (2006)
  - Total: 122
- Time zone: UTC+3:30 (IRST)
  - Summer (DST): UTC+4:30 (IRDT)

Dulab-e Shirin (Persian: دولاب شيرين, also Romanized as Dūlāb-e Shīrīn; also known as Dūlābshīrīn) is a village in Tayebi-ye Sarhadi-ye Gharbi Rural District, Charusa District, Kohgiluyeh County, Kohgiluyeh and Boyer-Ahmad Province, Iran. At the 2006 census, its population was 122, in 24 families.
