= Suza Rural District =

Rural district in Hormozgan province, Iran

Suza Rural District Persian: دهستان سوزا
- Rural District
- Location within Iran
- Coordinates: 26°47′36″N 56°01′29″E
- Country: Iran
- Province: Hormozgan
- County: Qeshm
- District: Shahab
- Capital: Suza

Population (2016)
  - Total: 6,974
- Time zone: UTC+3:30 (IRST)

Suza Rural District (Persian: دهستان سوزا) is in Shahab District of Qeshm County, Hormozgan province, Iran. It is administered from the city of Suza.

== Demographics ==
=== Population ===
At the time of the 2006 National Census, the rural district's population was 5,450 in 1,095 households. There were 6,298 inhabitants in 1,522 households at the following census of 2011. The 2016 census measured the population of the rural district as 6,974 in 1,864 households. The most populous of its 12 villages was Mesen, with 2,162 people.
