= Dulab-e Pain =

Dulab-e Pain دولاب پائين
- Village
- Location within Iran
- Coordinates: 29°42′04″N 53°23′11″E
- Country: Iran
- Province: Fars
- County: Arsanjan
- Bakhsh: Central
- Rural District: Shurab

Population (2006)
  - Total: 101
- Time zone: UTC+3:30 (IRST)
  - Summer (DST): UTC+4:30 (IRDT)

Dulab-e Pain (Persian: دولاب پائين, also Romanized as Dūlāb-e Pā’īn) is a village in Shurab Rural District, in the Central District of Arsanjan County, Fars province, Iran. At the 2006 census, its population was 101, in 18 families.
