= Hengam Rural District (Qeshm County) =

Rural district in Hormozgan province, Iran

Hengam Rural District Persian: دهستان هنگام
- Rural District
- Location within Iran
- Coordinates: 26°38′55″N 55°52′44″E
- Country: Iran
- Province: Hormozgan
- County: Qeshm
- District: Shahab
- Capital: Hengam-e Jadid

Population (2016)
  - Total: 521
- Time zone: UTC+3:30 (IRST)

Hengam Rural District (Persian: دهستان هنگام) is in Shahab District of Qeshm County, Hormozgan province, Iran. Its capital is the village of Hengam-e Jadid.

== Demographics ==
=== Population ===
At the time of the 2006 National Census, the rural district's population was 475 in 112 households. There were 417 inhabitants in 110 households at the following census of 2011. The 2016 census measured the population of the rural district as 521 in 146 households. The most populous of its four villages was Hengam-e Jadid, with 496 people.
