= Salakh Rural District =

Rural district in Hormozgan province, Iran

Salakh Rural District Persian: دهستان سلخ
- Rural District
- Location within Iran
- Coordinates: 26°46′40″N 55°42′50″E
- Country: Iran
- Province: Hormozgan
- County: Qeshm
- District: Hara
- Capital: Tabl

Population (2016)
  - Total: 13,901
- Time zone: UTC+3:30 (IRST)

Salakh Rural District (Persian: دهستان سلخ) is in Hara District of Qeshm County, Hormozgan province, Iran. Its capital is the village of Tabl.

== Demographics ==
=== Population ===
At the time of the 2006 National Census, the rural district's population (as a part of Shahab District) was 10,598 in 2,239 households. There were 11,846 inhabitants in 2,754 households at the following census of 2011. The 2016 census measured the population of the rural district as 13,901 in 3,513 households. The most populous of its 17 villages was Tabl, with 4,069 people.

In 2017, the rural district was separated from the district in the formation of Hara District.
