= Manjavan-e Gharbi Rural District =

Rural district in East Azerbaijan province, Iran

Manjavan-e Gharbi Rural District Persian: دهستان منجوان غربی
- Rural District
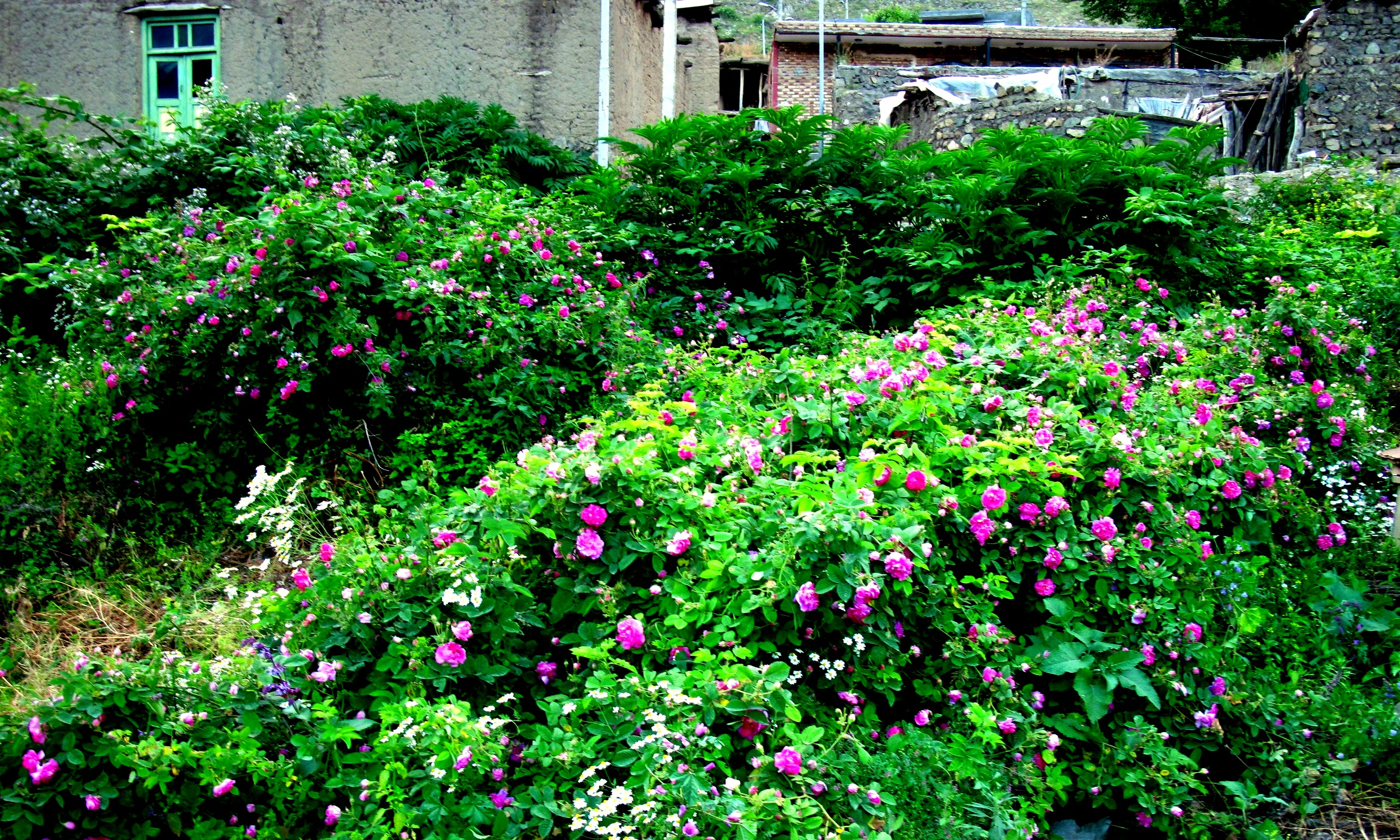
- Wild roses cover abandoned houses in Abbasabad, 2009

- Location within Iran
- Coordinates: 38°54′N 46°45′E
- Country: Iran
- Province: East Azerbaijan
- County: Khoda Afarin
- District: Manjavan
- Established: 1987
- Capital: Asheqlu

Population (2016)
  - Total: 4,094
- Time zone: UTC+3:30 (IRST)

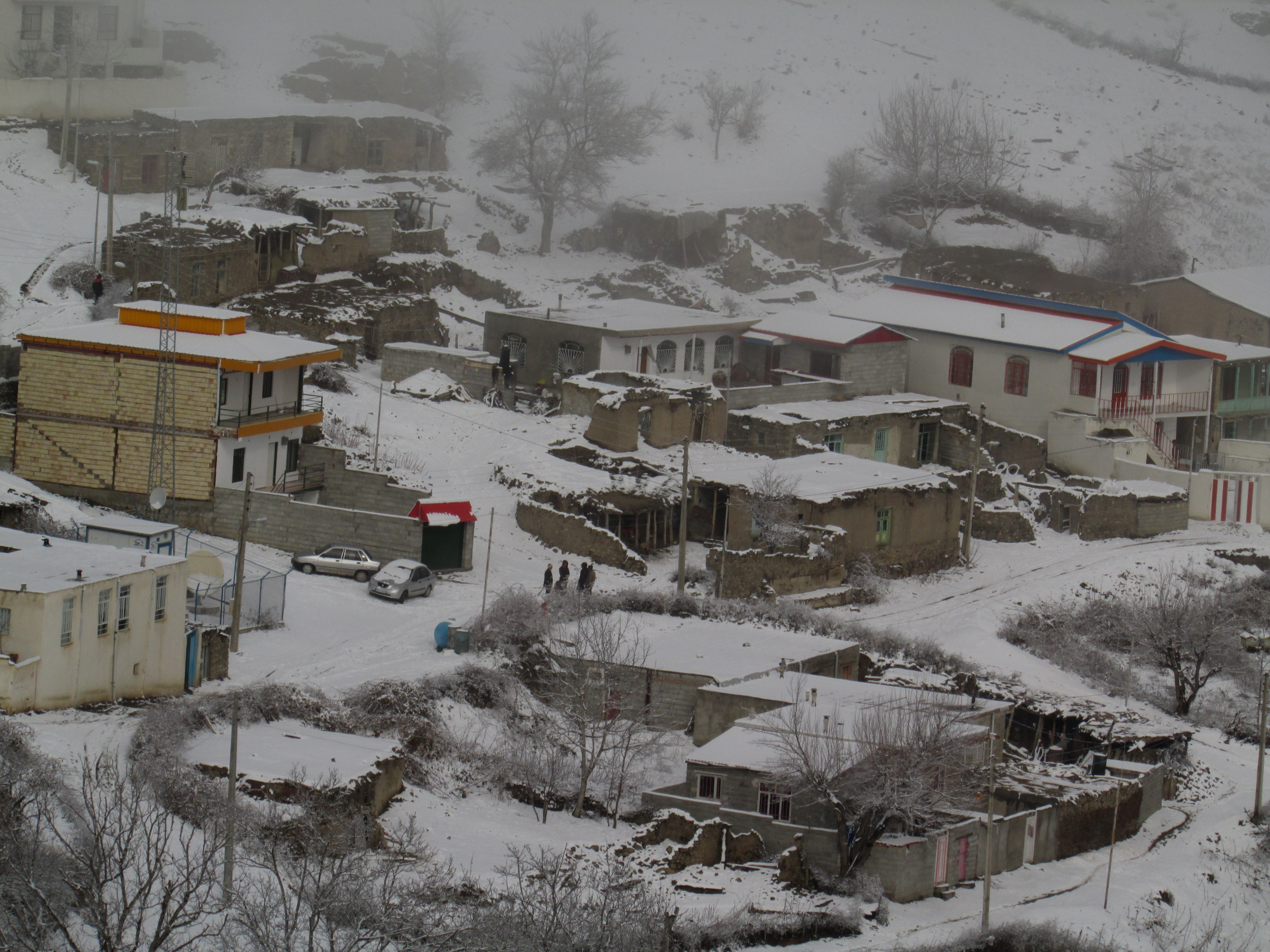
Abbasabad (2014).

Manjavan-e Gharbi Rural District (Persian: دهستان منجوان غربی (Note: Armenian: Հասանով Գաւառակ) is in Manjavan District of Khoda Afarin County, East Azerbaijan province, Iran. Its capital is the village of Asheqlu.

== History ==
In the wake of White Revolution (early 1960s) many clans of Mohammad Khanlu Tribe used the north part of the district as their winter quarters. The tribe's summer quarters were located in the mountains of the southern part, which include prime pastures.

== Demographics ==
=== Population ===
At the time of the 2006 National Census, the rural district's population (as a part of the former Khoda Afarin District in Kaleybar County) was 4,378 in 931 households. There were 4,214 inhabitants in 1,063 households at the following census of 2011, by which time the district had been separated from the county in the establishment of Khoda Afarin County. The rural district was transferred to the new Manjavan District. The 2016 census measured the population of the rural district as 4,094 in 1,282 households. The most populous of its 42 villages was Asheqlu, with 534 people.

=== Other villages in the rural district ===
- Alajujeh
- Ebrahim Sami
- Garmanab
- Kalaleh-ye Olya
- Kalaleh-ye Sofla
- Pesyan
- Uzan
