= Dulab Rural District (Qeshm County) =

Rural district in Hormozgan province, Iran

Dulab Rural District Persian: دهستان دولاب
- Rural District
- Location within Iran
- Coordinates: 26°37′25″N 55°25′01″E
- Country: Iran
- Province: Hormozgan
- County: Qeshm
- District: Hara
- Capital: Dulab

Population (2016)
  - Total: 10,591
- Time zone: UTC+3:30 (IRST)

Dulab Rural District (Persian: دهستان دولاب) is in Hara District of Qeshm County, Hormozgan province, Iran. Its capital is the village of Dulab.

== Demographics ==
=== Population ===
At the time of the 2006 National Census, the rural district's population (as a part of Shahab District) was 8,643 in 1,897 households. There were 9,792 inhabitants in 2,313 households at the following census of 2011. The 2016 census measured the population of the rural district as 10,591 in 2,725 households. The most populous of its 13 villages was Basaidu, with 2,228 people.

In 2017, the rural district was separated from the district in the formation of Hara District.
