= Shahab District =

District in Hormozgan province, Iran

Shahab District Persian: بخش شهاب
- District
- Location within Iran
- Coordinates: 26°47′N 56°00′E
- Country: Iran
- Province: Hormozgan
- County: Qeshm
- Capital: Suza

Population (2016)
  - Total: 38,115
- Time zone: UTC+3:30 (IRST)

Shahab District (Persian: بخش شهاب) is in Qeshm County, Hormozgan province, Iran. Its capital is the city of Suza.

== History ==
In 2017, Larak Rural District was separated from the district to join the Central District. Dulab and Salakh Rural Districts were separated from Shahab District in the formation of Hara District.

== Demographics ==
=== Population ===
At the time of the 2006 National Census, the district's population was 30,112 in 6,319 households. The following census in 2011 counted 33,538 people in 7,946 households. The 2016 census measured the population of the district as 38,115 inhabitants in 9,902 households.

=== Administrative divisions ===
Shahab District Population
Administrative Divisions	2006	2011	2016
Dulab RD (Note: Transferred to Hara District after the 2016 census)	8,643	9,792	10,591
Hengam RD	475	417	521
Larak RD (Note: Transferred to the Central District after the 2016 census)	466	473	421
Salakh RD	10,598	11,846	13,901
Suza RD	5,450	6,298	6,974
Suza (city)	4,480	4,712	5,707
Total	30,112	33,538	38,115
RD = Rural District
