= Tatari =

Tatari may refer to:

- Tatari (curse), vengeance exacted by onryō in Japanese folklore
- Tatari (spider), a genus of spiders
- Tatari, Tallinn, a subdistrict in the capital city of Estonia
- Tatari, Iran, a village in Iran
- Tatari, Pleven Province, a village in Belene Municipality, Bulgaria
- Tatari (manga), a manga series by Watari

== People with the name ==
- Miranda Tatari, Croatian handball player
- Tatari Ali, Nigerian politician
- Tatari Oguz Effendi, Ottoman intellectual

== See also ==
- Tatar (disambiguation)
- Tartary
- Tattare
- Tarati (disambiguation)
- Pop Tatari, a 1992 music album
