= Tata =

Tata or TATA may refer to:

== Places ==
- Tata, Hungary, a town
- Jamshedpur, a city in Jharkhand, India, also known as Tata
- Tata Islands, a pair of small islands off the coast of New Zealand
- Tata Province, Morocco
  - Tata, Morocco, a city in Tata Province
- Țâța, a river in Romania

== Companies ==
- Tata Sons, India's largest conglomerate and owner of Tata Group
- Tata Group, an Indian multinational conglomerate company
  - List of entities associated with Tata Group

== People ==
=== Surname ===
- Tata family, an influential family of India owning the Tata Group
  - Jamsetji Tata (1839–1904), known as the father of Indian industry
  - Dorabji Tata (1859–1932), Indian industrialist and philanthropist
  - Ratanji Tata (1871–1918), financier and philanthropist, son of Jamsetji Tata
  - J. R. D. Tata (1904–1993), Indian pioneer aviator and founder of Tata Airlines
  - Naval H. Tata (1904–1989), industrialist, recipient of Padma Bhushan
  - Ratan Naval Tata (1937–2024), chairman of the Tata Group (1991–2012)
  - Simone Tata (born 1930), chairperson of Trent
  - Noel Tata (born 1957), vice-chairman of Trent Ltd and managing director of Tata International, son of Simone Tata
- Anthony Tata (born 1959), US Army general and politician
- Bob Tata (1930–2021), American politician
- Daniel Tata (born 1990), Indonesian footballer
- Herabai Tata (1879–1941), Indian suffragist
- Joe E. Tata (1936–2022), American actor
- Jordan Tata (born 1981), American baseball player
- Mithan Jamshed Lam (née Tata; 1898–1981) Indian barrister and lawyer at the Bombay High Court
- Sam Tata (1911–2005), Canadian photographer
- Terry Tata (born 1940), American baseball umpire

=== Given name or nickname ===
- Tata (king of Awan), the second king of the Awan dynasty (c. 2400 – c. 2015 BC)
- Augusto Pinochet (1915–2006), Chilean dictator, commonly referred to in Chile as "El tata"
- Carlos Manuel Baldomir (born 1971), Argentine boxer nicknamed "Tata"
- Gerardo Martino (born 1962), former football player and current manager, more commonly known as "Tata"
- Nelson Mandela (1918–2013), South African President, commonly known in South Africa as "Tata"
- Tata Amaral (born 1960), Brazilian director, writer, producer, and actor
- Tata Esteban (1954–2003), Filipino producer-director
- Tata Giacobetti (1922–1988), Italian singer
- Tata Güines (1930–2008), Cuban percussionist
- Tata Simonyan (born 1962), Armenian singer
- Táta Vega (born 1951), American vocalist
- Tatá Werneck (born 1983), Brazilian actress
- Tata Young (born 1980), Thai singer, model and actress
- Tatá (footballer, born 1947), Brazilian footballer Irineu Finavaro
- Tata (footballer, born 1953), Brazilian footballer Mário Felipe Perez

== Other uses ==
- Tata (fortification), a West African type of fortification
- Tata of Sikasso, the former fortifying wall around the city of Sikasso, Mali
- Tata (Middle-earth), one of the first Elves in J. R. R. Tolkien's Middle-earth legendarium
- TATA, station code for Tatanagar Junction railway station, Jamshedpur, India
- Internet slang for a human breast

== See also ==
- TATA box, a DNA sequence
- Ta-Ta, the Uruguayan subsidiary of Almacenes Tía
- Ta-ta theory, one of the theories on the origin of human language
- Tatar (disambiguation)
- Tatra (disambiguation)
- Data (disambiguation)
- Dada (disambiguation)
