= Tatar =

Tatar may refer to:

== Peoples ==
- Tatar (term), an ethnonym whose meaning has varied throughout history
- Tatars, an umbrella term for different Turkic ethnic groups bearing the name "Tatar"
- Volga Tatars, a people from the Volga-Ural region of western Russia
- Crimean Tatars, a people from the Crimea peninsula by the Black Sea
- Siberian Tatars, a people from western Siberia
- Lipka Tatars, a people from Poland, Lithuania, and Belarus
- Afghan Tatars, an ethnic group in Afghanistan
- Tatar (Hazara tribe), a tribe of Hazara people in Afghanistan
- Transcaucasian Tatars, modern Azerbaijani people living in Transcaucasia, called Tatars until the Bolshevik Revolution
- North Caucasian Tatars or Dagestan Tatars, today known as the Kumyks of Dagestan
- Tatar confederation, one of the major Mongol tribes of the 13th century

== Languages ==
The Tatar languages are within the Kipchak branch of the Turkic family of languages.

- Tatar language, language of the Volga Tatars mainly spoken in modern Tatarstan, Crimea, and Siberia (though distinct from Siberian Tatar below).
- Armeno-Kipchak language, self referred to as Tatarça
- Crimean Tatar language, language of the Crimean Tatars
- Dobrujan Tatar language, a variant close Crimean Tatar, spoken mainly in Romania and Bulgaria
- Siberian Tatar language, language of the Siberian Tatars
- Cuman language, self referred to as Tatar til, a West Kipchak Turkic language
- Old Tatar language, also called Ural-Volga Turki, a literary language used among the Muslim Tatars from the Middle Ages until the 19th century
- Tatar alphabets, scripts currently used for the Tatar language

== Places ==
=== Azerbaijan ===
- Tatar, Azerbaijan (disambiguation), various Tatar named places in Azerbaijan
- Tatar, Jabrayil, a village in Azerbaijan
- Tatar, Qubadli, a village in Azerbaijan
- Tatar, Zangilan, a village in Azerbaijan

=== Iran ===
- Shahrak Tatar, a village in Iran
- Tatar, Khuzestan, a village in Iran
- Tatar, North Khorasan, a village in Iran
- Tatar Bayjeq, a village in Iran
- Tatar-e Olya, Golestan, a village in Iran
- Tatar-e Sofla, Golestan, a village in Iran
- Tatar-e Olya, East Azerbaijan, a village in Iran
- Tatar-e Sofla, East Azerbaijan, a village in Iran
- Tatar, West Azerbaijan, a village in Iran

=== Poland ===
- Tatar, Łódź Voivodeship, a village in Poland

=== Turkey ===
- Tatar, Amasya, a village in Amasya Province, Turkey
- Tatar, Çorum

== People ==
=== Given name ===
- Tatar Khan, Governor of Sonargaon during 1259-1268 CE
- Tatar Khan Naghir (d. 1611), Eastern Afghan Confederates soldier
- Goenda Tatar (lit. 'Detective Goenda'), a fictional Indian detective

=== Surname ===
- Daniel Tătar (born 1987), Romanian footballer
- Ersin Tatar (born 1960), Turkish Cypriot politician and Prime Minister of Northern Cyprus
- Gülsüm Tatar (born 1985), Turkish female boxer
- Maria Tatar, American academic
- Nur Tatar (born 1992), Turkish female taekwondo practitioner
- Peter Tatár (born 1953), Slovak politician
- Stanisław Tatar (1896–1980), Polish general
- Tomáš Tatar (born 1990), Slovak ice hockey player

== See also ==
- Norwegian and Swedish Travellers, Romani people sometimes referred to as tatere or tattare
- Rouran Khaganate, from Chinese rendering of Tatar
- Tartar (disambiguation)
- Tater (disambiguation)
- Tartary, a term in Western European literature and cartography for a vast part of Asia
- Tatra (company)
