= Tar (disambiguation) =

Tar is a viscous organic black or dark brown liquid.

Tar or TAR may also refer to:

== Arts, entertainment and media ==
=== Film and television ===
- Tár, a 2022 psychological drama film
- The Color of Time, or Tar, a 2012 film
- The Amazing Race, a reality TV franchise
  - The Amazing Race (American TV series)

=== Literature ===
- Tar: A Midwest Childhood, a 1926 fictionalized memoir by Sherwood Anderson

=== Music ===
- Tar (band), an American band
- Tar (drum), a drum from North Africa and the Middle East
- Tar (string instrument), a long-necked, waisted lute family instrument
- Tar (Azerbaijani instrument), a long-necked, plucked lute
- "Tar" (song), by Visage, 1979

== People ==
- Pál Tar (born 1931), Hungarian businessman and diplomat
- Zsolt Tar (born 1993), Hungarian footballer
- T. A. Robertson (1909-1994), known as TAR, Scottish intelligence officer
- Tunku Abdul Rahman (1903-1990), founding father of Malaysia

== Places ==
- Tar, Hungary
- Tar (Tar-Vabriga), Croatia
- Tar, Isfahan, Iran
- Tar Tajik Township, Akto County, Xinjiang, China
- Tar River, in North Carolina, U.S.
- Tar (Kyrgyzstan), a river
- River Tar, in County Tipperary, Ireland
- Tar Island, Ontario, Canada
- Tar Rocks, Isle of Portland, Dorset, England
- Tar Tunnel, an abandoned mining tunnel in Coalport, England
- Tibet Autonomous Region, an autonomous region of the People's Republic of China
- Tuvan Arat Republic, or Tuvan People's Republic, a former state in North Asia

== Science and technology ==
- Tar (tobacco residue), the partially combusted particulate matter produced by smoking
- tar (computing), a computer software utility for archiving
- TAR syndrome (thrombocytopenia with absent radius), a genetic disorder
- Target acquisition radar (TAR), a type of radar
- Tissue-to-air ratio, a term in radiation therapy treatment
- Transverse aeolian ridges (TARs), features on Mars
- Trans-activation response element, in HIV
- Turnaround (refining), a scheduled maintenance event of an industrial plant
- IPCC Third Assessment Report (TAR) of the Intergovernmental Panel on Climate Change

== Transport ==
- TAR Aerolíneas, a Mexican airline
- Transporte Aéreo Rioplatense, a former Argentine cargo airline
- Tunisair (ICAO code TAR), a Tunisian airline, ICAO airline code TAR
- Taranto-Grottaglie Airport, Taranto, Italy, IATA airport code TAR
- Trans-Asian Railway, a UN project to create an integrated freight railway network across Europe and Asia

== Other uses ==
- TAR or "Trichy assault rifle," an Indian assault rifle
- IWI Tavor, an Israeli assault rifle, previously designated Tavor TAR-21 or T.A.R. 21
- Jack Tar, or British Tar, an English term for sailor
- Time at risk (TaR), a risk measure for corporate finance
- Teen Age Republicans, a youth wing of the U.S. Republican Party
- Tribunale Amministrativo Regionale, part of the Judiciary of Italy
- Tengku Ampuan Rahimah Hospital or TAR Hospital, in Klang, Selangor, Malaysia

== See also ==
- Tars (disambiguation)
- Asphalt concrete, or tarmac
- British Tar (disambiguation)
