= Tartarian =

Tartarian may be the adjective form of:

- Tartarus, a place in the underworld of Greek mythology
- Tartary, a historic name for much of Central and Northern Asia
- Tatars, several Turkic groups
- Tatar languages, several Turkic languages with the name

== See also ==
- Black Tartarian, a cherry cultivar
- Tartaric acid
- Tartar (disambiguation)
- Tatar (disambiguation)
- Tartarus (disambiguation)
- Tartarian Empire, pseudohistorical empire
- Aura Soltana, also known as Ipolitan the Tartarian, a Russia woman at the English court in the 1560s
