= Tatar, Azerbaijan =

Tatar, Azerbaijan may refer to:

- Tatar, Jabrayil
- Tatar, Qubadli
- Tatar, Zangilan
