= Tarr (disambiguation) =

Tarr is a modernist novel by Wyndham Lewis.

Tarr may also refer to:

== People ==
- Béla Tarr (1955–2026), Hungarian film director and screenwriter
- Ben Tarr (born 1994), American rugby player
- Bruce Tarr (born 1964), American politician
- Christian Tarr (1765–1833), American politician
- Curtis W. Tarr (1924–2013), American academic, university president and government official
- Derek Tarr (born 1959), American tennis player
- Don Tarr (1910–1980), Wales rugby player
- Edward Tarr (1936–2020), American trumpet player and musicologist
- Eric Tarr (born 1972), American politician
- Frank Tarr (1887–1915), English rugby player
- Frederick H. Tarr (1868–1944), American attorney and politician
- Graeme Tarr (1936–2020), New Zealand cricketer
- Heather Tarr (born 1974), American softball player and coach
- Herbert Tarr (1929–1993), American rabbi, novelist and humorist
- J. L. Tarr (1919–2008), American chief scout
- Jerry Tarr (born 1939), American football player
- Joel A. Tarr (born 1934), American historian
- Judith Tarr (born 1955), American fantasy and science fiction author
- Katarina Tarr (born 1987) American soccer player
- Michael J. Tarr, American cognitive neuroscientist
- Peri Tarr (21st century), IBM employee
- Ralph Stockman Tarr (1864–1912), American geographer
- Ron Tarr (1936–1997), British actor
- Wrex Tarr (1934–2006), Rhodesian comedian, news presenter and archer

== Other uses ==
- Black Jack Tarr, a fictional character in the Marvel Universe
- Mount Tarr, a mountain of Antarctica

== See also ==
- Tar (disambiguation)
- Tarr Steps
- Tarr Family Playground
