= Tatar-e Sofla =

Tatar-e Sofla (Persian: تاتارسفلي), also known as Tatar-e Pain, may refer to:

- Tatar-e Sofla, East Azerbaijan
- Tatar-e Sofla, Golestan
