= Tars =

Tars or TARS may refer to:

== Arts and entertainment ==
- TARS, a fictional robot in the film Interstellar
- Tars Tarkas, a fictional character in Edgar Rice Burroughs' Barsoom series
- The Tars, a 1934 Dutch comedy film drama

== Businesses and organisations ==
- The Arthur Ransome Society, or Tars, based on British children's author Arthur Ransome
- Teen Age Republicans, TARs, a youth wing of the US Republican Party
- Transporturi Aeriene Româno-Sovietice, TARS, former name of airline TAROM

== Science and technology ==
- TARS (gene), gene which encodes a human enzyme
- Tethered Aerostat Radar System, an American low-level airborne ground surveillance system
- Torqued Accelerator using Radiation from the Sun (TARS), a quasite light mill accelerator

== Other uses ==
- Tårs, a village in Denmark
- Rollins Tars, the sports teams and mascot of Rollins College, Florida, US
- Third Avenue Railway, a former streetcar system in New York City

== See also ==
- Tar (disambiguation)
- Tartarium, also called cloth of Tars
- The King of Tars, a medieval English chivalric romance
