= Tartaric =

Tartaric may mean:

- containing tartaric acid or tartrates
- pertaining to Tartary or the Tatars

== See also ==
- Tartarian (disambiguation)
