= Tatar-e Olya =

Tatar-e Olya (Persian: تاتارعليا), also known as Tatar-e Bala, may refer to:

- Tatar-e Olya, East Azerbaijan
- Tatar-e Olya, Golestan
