= Minjavan =

Minjavan (Persian: منجوان) may refer to:

- Minjavan District
- Minjavan-e Gharbi Rural District
- Minjavan-e Sharqi Rural District
