= Tarati =

Tarati may refer to:

- Tarati, Pakistan, a village in Pakistan
- Tarati, Bangladesh, a subdivision of Muktagacha Upazila, Bangladesh
- Tekeeua Tarati, politician from Kiribati

== See also ==
- Tatari (disambiguation)
