= Ta-Ta =

Uruguayan supermarket chain

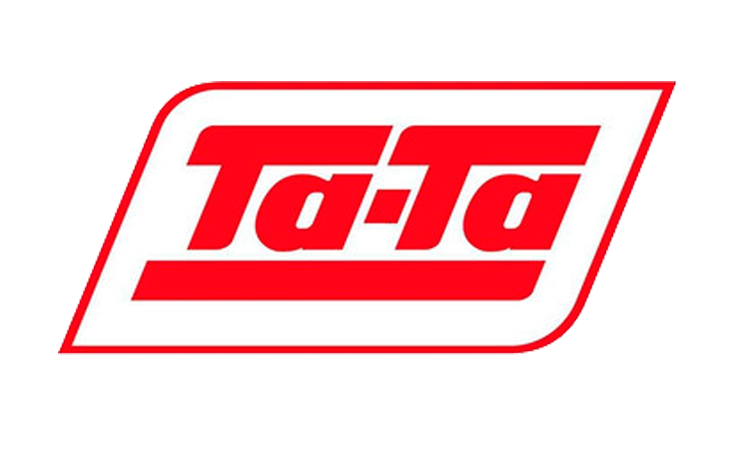
- Type: Sociedad Anónima
- Industry: Retail
- Founded: 1956; 70 years ago in Uruguay
- Headquarters: Montevideo, Uruguay
- Products: Hypermarket, supermarket
- Website: www.tata.com.uy

Ta-Ta is a chain of supermarkets and hypermarkets in Uruguay, with a presence in the national territory.

== History ==
In the 60s, the Almacenes Tía supermarket chain decided to establish itself in Uruguay through an expansion process.

Initially, the company was going to maintain and use the name Almacenes Tía for these stores, but because that name was already used in the country, it had to modify its name by choosing Ta-Ta, the affectionate way in which many Uruguayans and Latin Americans they call their grandparents.

Finally, Tata would open his first department store on June 13, 1956 on the corner of 18 de Julio Avenue and Carlos Roxlo, thus establishing a revolutionary business model, of course unknown at the time.

Later, in the mid-90s, Tata ventured into supermarkets, developing an expansion plan, contributing to decentralization and opening stores in the interior of the country.

In 2011, this process culminated when it reached department number 19. In 2013, after the purchase and acquisition, it absorbed all the MultiAhorro supermarkets, adding new branches and presence in the country.

== Stores ==
Ta-Ta has stores in all departments of Uruguay. Most of them are located on the main avenues and cities of the country. It is also present in different shopping centers in the country, such as Costa Urbana Shopping, Las Piedras Shopping, Mercado Agrícola, Tres Cruces, among others. In all their branches they have a small division of MultiAhorro Hogar.

Departments	Nº of Stores
Artigas	1
Canelones	6
Cerro Largo	1
Colonia	4
Durazno	1
Florida	1
Flores	1
Lavalleja	1
Maldonado	3
Montevideo	33
Paysandú	4
Río Negro	1
Rivera	2
Rocha	2
Salto	2
San José	1
Soriano	1
Tacuarembó	3
Treinta y Tres	1

Name	City
Hiper Artigas	Artigas
Hiper Canelones	Ciudad de Canelones
Hiper Piedras	Las Piedras
Hiper Durazno	Durazno
Hiper Trinidad	Trinidad
Hiper Melo	Melo
Hiper Cerro	Cerro de Montevideo
Hiper Paysandú	Ciudad de Paysandú
Hiper Salto	Ciudad de Salto
Hiper Mercedes	Mercedes
Hiper Tacuarembó	Ciudad de Tacuarembó

== Ta-Ta Express ==
Ta-Ta was one of the first to venture into the express minimarket fashion, this was due to the acquisition of the Multi Ahorro Express branches, which were later modified and expanded the presence of these branches, mainly in the central neighborhoods of Montevideo.

Store	Location
Express Agraciada	Arroyo Seco
Express San Martín	Aguada
Express Canelones	Central Montevideo
Express San José	Central Montevideo
Express Constituyente	Central Montevideo
Express Río Branco	Central Montevideo
Express Avenida Italia	Malvín
Express Libertad	Pocitos
Express Buceo	Buceo
Express Gral Flores	Ituzaingó
