= Dash Arasi =

Dash Arasi داش اراسي
- Village
- Location within Iran
- Coordinates: 39°00′17″N 46°46′38″E
- Country: Iran
- Province: East Azerbaijan
- County: Khoda Afarin
- Bakhsh: Minjavan
- Rural District: Minjavan-e Sharqi

Population (2006)
  - Total: 41
- Time zone: UTC+3:30 (IRST)
  - Summer (DST): UTC+4:30 (IRDT)

Dash Arasi (Persian: داش اراسي, also romanized as Dāsh Ārāsī and Dasharasy; also known as Dasharehsī and Mīān Sang) is a village in Minjavan-e Sharqi Rural District, Minjavan District, Khoda Afarin County, East Azerbaijan Province, Iran. At the 2006 census, its population was 41, in 10 families.
