= Tatra =

Tatra may refer to:

- Tatra Mountains, a mountain range in Slovakia and Poland
  - Tatra County, an administrative division of Poland in the region of the Tatra Mountains
  - Tatra National Park, Poland, a national park in Poland
  - Tatra National Park, Slovakia, a national park in Slovakia
- Low Tatras, a mountain range in Slovakia
- "Tatra Tiger", the nickname for the economy of Slovakia during its high growth period since 1998
- Tatra (company), a car and truck manufacturer from the Czech Republic
- ČKD Tatra, a producer of trams from the Czech Republic
- Tatra, Estonia, a village in Tartu County, Estonia
- Tátra-class destroyer, a torpedo boat class of the Austro-Hungarian Navy
- Tatra pine vole, a species of vole
- FK Tatra Kisač, a football club in Serbia
- Tatra, a Czech brand of milk produced in Hlinsko
- Tatra, a Polish brand of beer produced by the Żywiec Brewery

== See also ==
- Tatar (disambiguation)
- Tartar (disambiguation)
