= Daraghazi =

Daraghazi داراغزي
- Village
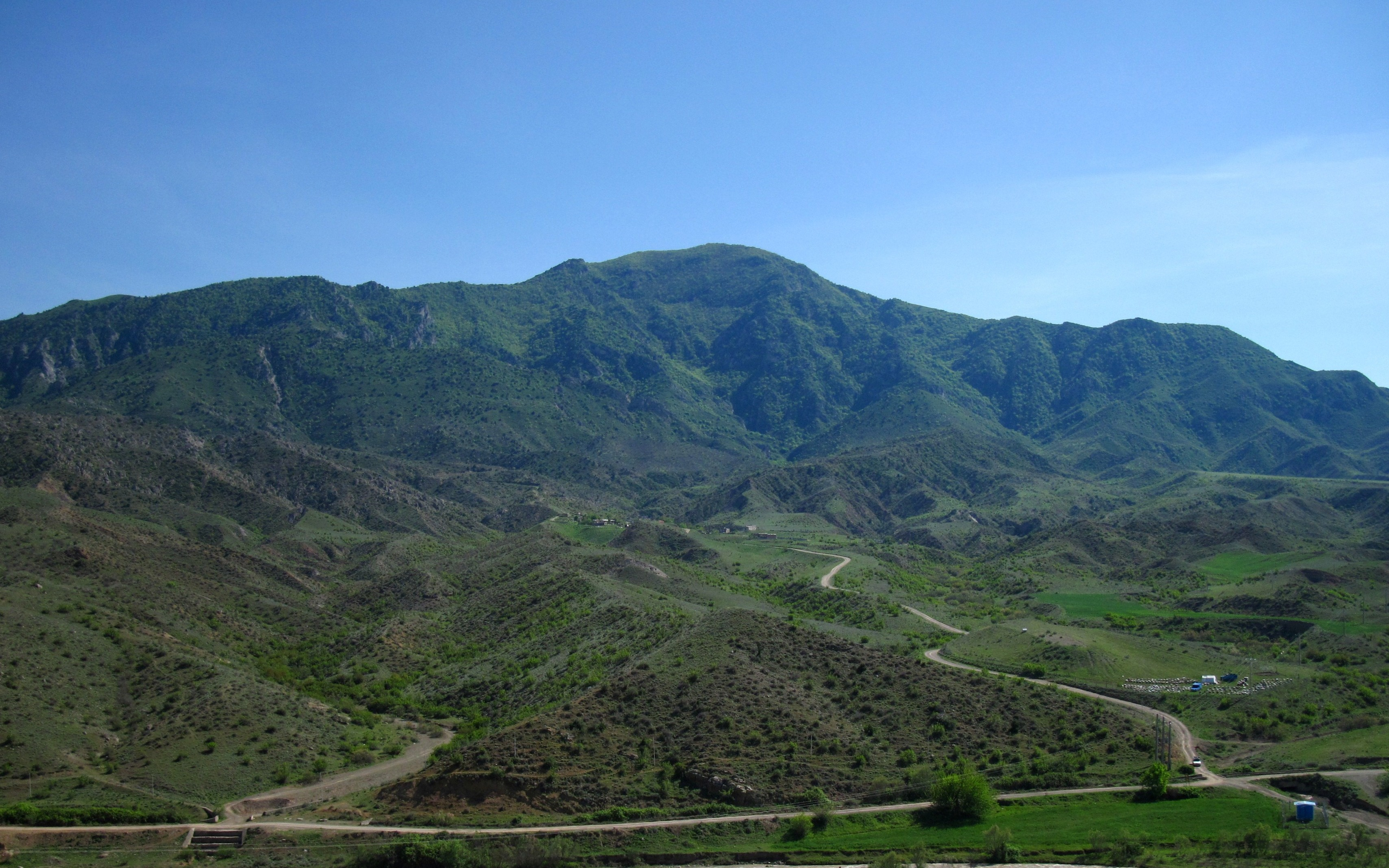
- Village view in January 2014

- Location within Iran
- Coordinates: 39°05′01″N 46°54′07″E
- Country: Iran
- Province: East Azerbaijan
- County: Khoda Afarin
- Bakhsh: Minjavan
- Rural District: Minjavan-e Sharqi

Population (2006)
  - Total: 68
- Time zone: UTC+3:30 (IRST)
  - Summer (DST): UTC+4:30 (IRDT)

Daraghazi (Persian: دارآغزی, also Romanized as Dārāghazī; also known as Ḩeydar Kānlū-ye Soflá) is a village in Minjavan-e Sharqi Rural District, Minjavan District, Khoda Afarin County, East Azerbaijan Province, Iran. At the 2006 census, its population was 68, in 22 families.

== Situation ==
Online edition of the Dehkhoda Dictionary, quoting Iranian Army files, reports a population of 54 people in late 1940s.
