= Qaqalu =

Qaqalu قاقالو
- Village
- Location within Iran
- Coordinates: 39°04′11″N 46°51′51″E
- Country: Iran
- Province: East Azerbaijan
- County: Khoda Afarin
- Bakhsh: Minjavan
- Rural District: Minjavan-e Sharqi

Population (2006)
  - Total: 77
- Time zone: UTC+3:30 (IRST)
  - Summer (DST): UTC+4:30 (IRDT)

Qaqalu (Persian: قاقالو, also Romanized as Qāqālū) is a village in Minjavan-e Sharqi Rural District, Minjavan District, Khoda Afarin County, East Azerbaijan Province, Iran. At the 2006 census, its population was 77, in 25 families.
