= Tater =

Tater may refer to:

- Potato
  - Tater tot, a deep-fried grated potato side-dish similar to hash browns
  - Taters, branding for deep-fried potato wedges served by the Mary Brown's restaurant chain in Canada
- A home run in baseball jargon
- Tater, a baseball bat manufacturer
- The protagonist of the animated Disney series Primos
- Taters, the former German name of Totoi, a village within the commune of Sântimbru, Alba, Transylvania, Romania

== See also ==
- Norwegian and Swedish Travellers, Romani people also known as tatere or tattare
- Tatar (disambiguation)
