= Tartar =

Tartar may refer to:

== Places ==
- Tartar (river), a river in Azerbaijan
- Tartar, Switzerland, a village in the Grisons
- Tartar (city), capital of Tartar District, Azerbaijan
- Tartar District, Azerbaijan
- Tartar Island, South Shetland Islands, Antarctica

== People and languages ==
- Tartar, someone from Tartary, the historical central Asian region populated by Manchus, Mongols, Turks, and others
- Tatars, a Turkic ethnic group native to present-day Russia and Ukraine
  - Tatar languages

== Chemicals ==
- Potassium bitartrate, also called cream of tartar
- Tartaric acid, commonly mixed with sodium bicarbonate and sold as baking powder

== Food ==
- Steak tartare, a meat dish made from raw ground (minced) beef or horsemeat
- Tartar sauce, a condiment primarily composed of mayonnaise and finely chopped capers
- Cream of tartar, the culinary name for potassium bitartrate, a dry, powdery, acidic byproduct of fermenting grapes into wine

== Military ==
- Tartar (1813 privateer), an American privateer schooner during the War of 1812
- HMS Tartar, the name of several Royal Navy Vessels
- RIM-24 Tartar, a missile
- Tartar Guided Missile Fire Control System

== Transportation ==
- Tartar, a GWR Iron Duke Class locomotive built 1848
- Tartar, a GWR 3031 Class locomotive built 1895

== Other uses ==
- Tartar (horse), a racehorse
- Commander Tartar, the antagonist of the Octo Expansion DLC of Splatoon 2
- Dental tartar or calculus, hardened dental plaque
- Tartar Sauce, a swear word for SpongeBob SquarePants
- Wayne State Tartars, now called the Warriors
- Tartarus, in Greek mythology, a place in the underworld
- Tartarium, a middle age expensive fabric also known as Cloth of Tars

== See also ==
- East Tartary
- Lake Tharthar
- Tartary
- Tatra (disambiguation)
