= Age at risk =

Age at Risk (AaR) is a time-based risk measure designed to measure longevity risk in actuarial models.

AaR represents certain quantile for a given probability distribution, so is similar to Value at Risk (VaR). But, AaR measures risk amount as time (time until an adverse event) rather than value (loss amount).

Age at Risk is a special case of Time at Risk (TaR). When TaR is applied to a household's financial planning rather than corporate finance, TaR in this case is referred to as AaR.

In fact, TaR is an expanded idea from AaR which is originated by actuaries. In actuaries's view, loss model and survival model are identical, so they could naturally transform VaR into time-based measure. Survival model is actively used in life insurance modeling, but the application is not limited to this area. Anything that has lifespan can be a subject of survival model; for example, durability of products, default of bonds, bankruptcy of companies etc. AaR had been used in models that include a person's lifetime as a random variable, and it was naturally expanded to TaR as actuaries generalized subjects of models.

== Definition ==
Mathematical definition of AaR is same as that of VaR.

However, value-based random variable is replaced with time-based one (age), and given time-horizon is replaced with given finance structure of a household.
