= British Tar =

British Tar may refer to:

- British Tar or Jack Tar, a nickname for a sailor
- British Tar (ship), several ships
- "A British Tar", a song from Gilbert and Sullivan's 1878 operetta, H.M.S. Pinafore
- British Tar Products, a company distilling coal tar
