= Tartarus (disambiguation) =

Tartarus refers to a deity and place in Greek mythology.

Tartarus may also refer to:

- Tartarus, a Greek New Testament word used for Hell (in Christian belief), derived from the pagan Greek use.
- Tartaros, a Norwegian black metal solo project by Charmand Grimloch a.k.a. Joachim Rygg.
- Tartarus (spider), a genus of spiders in the family Stiphidiidae.
- Tartarus, the Latin name of the river Tartaro-Canalbianco in Italy.
- HMS Tartarus, the name of three ships of the Royal Navy and one planned one.
- Tartarus (DC Comics), a group of DC comic book supervillains.
- Tartarus, a character in the Halo universe.
- Tartarus Press, a limited edition publishing house.
- Tartarus Dorsa, an ice ridge on the dwarf planet Pluto.
- Tartaros, a dark guild from the anime/manga Fairy Tail.
- Tartarus, a 2005 film by Dave Wascavage.
- Tartarus/Tarterus, an evil Outer Plane in Dungeons & Dragons

In other usage:

- A fictional "hottest point" of the sun in the novel Seven Ancient Wonders.
- A fictional planet in the computer game Warhammer 40,000: Dawn of War.
- A fictional planet in the Stargate SG-1 universe.
- The artificial person creation and maintenance arcology in Appleseed media.
- The name of the tower which is one of the primary locations in the video game Persona 3.
- The name of the landship piloted by Malkuthian colonel Jade Curtiss in the PS2 and 3DS video game Tales of the Abyss.
- The location villains are sent to in the cartoon series My Little Pony. The gate is guarded by Cerberus.
- A software backup program, for use in Unix and Unix-like environments such as Linux and FreeBSD.
- The name of a special prison for villains in the anime/manga series My Hero Academia.
