= Tatar, West Azerbaijan =

Tatar تاتار
- Village
- Location within Iran
- Coordinates: 39°24′49″N 44°39′35″E
- Country: Iran
- Province: West Azerbaijan
- County: Maku
- Bakhsh: Central
- Rural District: Chaybasar-e Jonubi

Population (2006)
  - Total: 38
- Time zone: UTC+3:30 (IRST)
  - Summer (DST): UTC+4:30 (IRDT)

Tatar (Persian: تاتار, also Romanized as Tātār) is a village in Chaybasar-e Jonubi Rural District, in the Central District of Maku County, West Azerbaijan Province, Iran. At the 2006 census, its population was 38, in 7 families.
