= Tatari Oguz Effendi =

Ottoman educationist, literature teacher, translator, art collector and writer

The souvenir busts for public purchase in Weimar.

Tatarî Oğuz Effendi (March 1831 – 19 May 1871) was an Ottoman educationist, literature teacher, translator, art collector and writer.

== Early life ==
Tatarî Oğuz Effendi was born in Paris. While still very young, in 1838, his father, Tatarî Enis, who was the personal messenger of the Sultan Mahmud II, brought him to Dersaadet (today’s Istanbul). Tatarî Oğuz Effendi studied at the Enderun School between 1843 and 1848.

== Youth ==
Following his graduation, between the age of seventeen and nineteen (1848–1850) he worked as a French translator. Between 1850 and 1852, he worked as a translator of stories from French into Ottoman Turkish for the first private Ottoman newspaper Ceride-i Havadis. Between 1852 and 1854, he worked for the first official Ottoman newspaper to be published within the Ottoman borders, Takvim-i Vekayi, again as a French translator and published dozens of articles and short stories.

Between 1854 and 1856, he worked as the apprentice and assistant for the Reis-ül-Küttab at the Ministry of Foreign Affairs, where he translated political documents. In 1856, he was appointed to be the literature teacher at Enderun School, his former school, where he worked for two years, until 1858.

Having mastered his skills in teaching literature based on dialectics of languages between French and Ottoman Turkish, Tatarî was entrusted with the task to teach in foreign lands, in Mekteb-i Osmânî, the high-school of the Ottoman Empire in Paris.

== Teaching ==
From the beginning of his career at the school in late 1858, Tatarî developed seven principles to follow in his seminars, which would, in his mind, foster better results for his students.

1. To embrace the local and national literature as equally as possible.
2. To augment the participation of students through sincerity and dialogue.
3. Practice makes perfect. Reading and writing exercises in every session.
4. French as the first language to be used during classes and during breaks.
5. Language is something ALIVE. For perfection, it should be practised in daily life.
6. Education does not occur solely in a building. Go out!
7. Education does not start with the school and it never ends.

His efforts in an 'open-air' educational system would not be applied to the other courses, and would not be enough to effect long-term changes. Consequently, the school would face abolishment in 1864, six years after Tatarî's arrival in Paris.

== Collector for the Modern Museum of Art in Istanbul ==
During the Era of Tanzimat, the Ottoman Empire began to send pupils to Paris and to Sorbonne art schools to create a generation of contemporary artists with an academic education. In addition, they considered establishing a museum of modern art in Istanbul. In December 1860, Tatarî Oğuz Effendi was commissioned for the acquisition of the artworks.

It is stated in the Ottoman Paris Embassy Archive that until 1863, there were remarkable names in his collection, such as Daumier, Ingres, Delacroix, Monet and many more.

In 1863, after visiting the major art show of the year, the legendary Salon, Tatarî Oğuz Effendi decided to resign his job and wrote a letter to Sultan Abdülaziz, explaining why he thought a museum of modern art would later trigger the end of an Empire, arguing primarily on the idea that the art he collected was based on Christian values. The Ottoman Sultan agreed with this argumentation and the Empire could not accomplish the goal of opening its first museum of modern art.

== Secretly in Basel ==
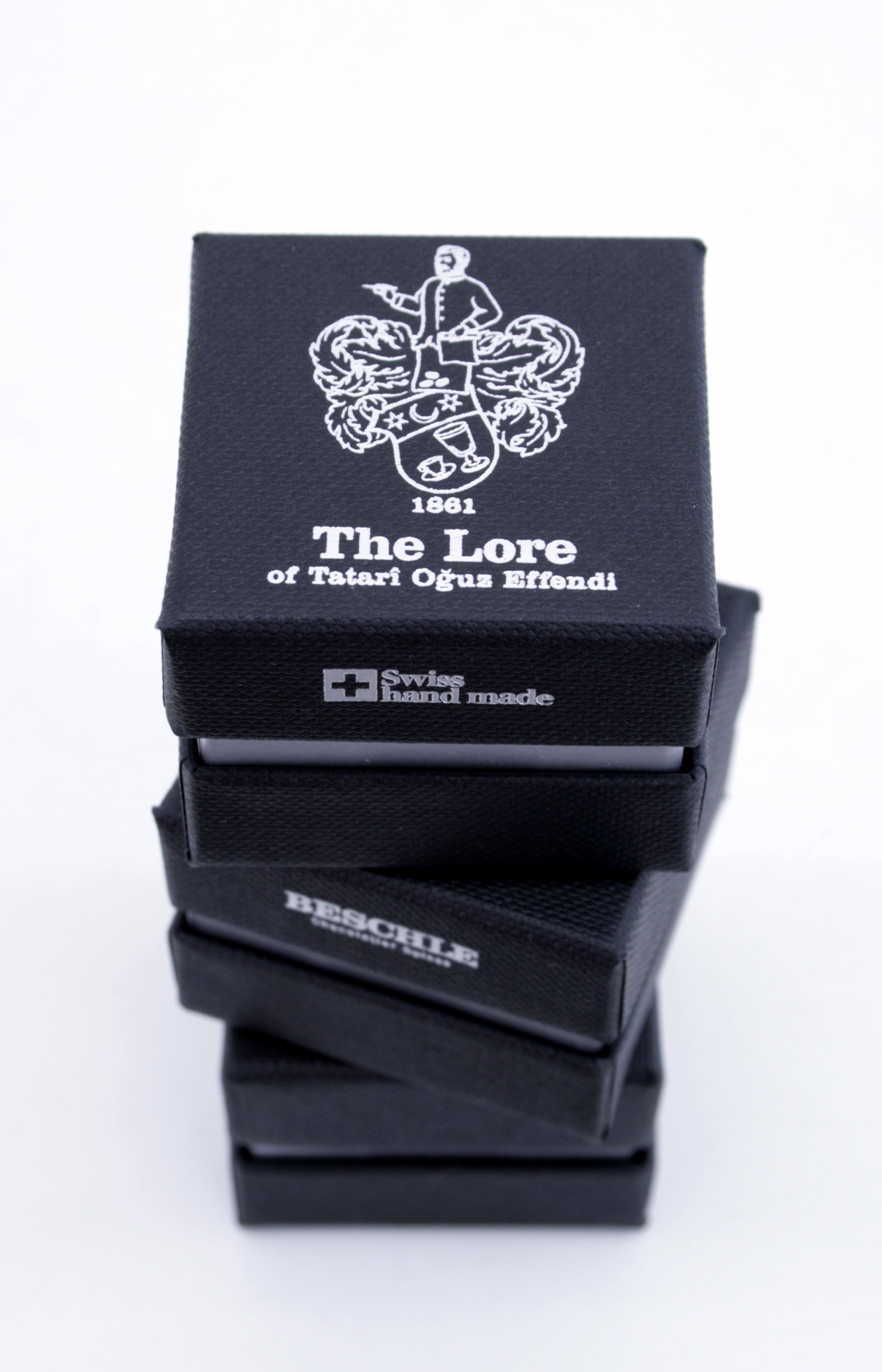
The Lore of Tatari Oguz Effendi is produced by Beschle Chocolatier Suisse

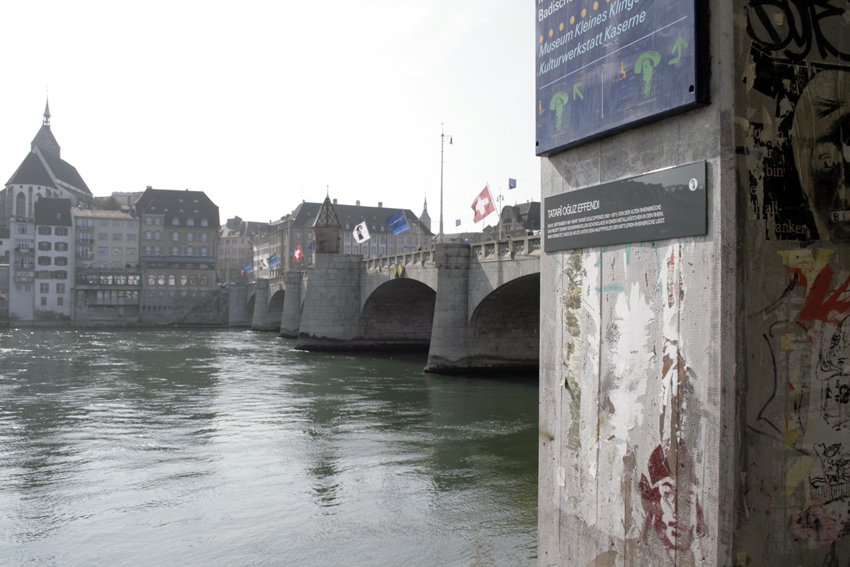
The plaque on the Mittlere Rheinbrücke in Basel

Just a few months after Tatarî accepted his new employment as the imperial art collector, he began secretly traveling to Basel. Between March and September 1861 he visited the city thirteen times, coming every other weekend with only two disruptions to this schedule, and lodged in the Hotel Gasthof zum Wilden Mann. During his stays in Basel, he developed a chocolate recipe that is a fusion of Turkish coffee and Swiss absinthe. For the production of the chocolate, he used South American cocoa beans that were brought from the Suchard factory in Neuchâtel by his friend Louis-Daniel Perrier. In his letter to Perrier, which is found in a private archive in Neuchâtel, he talks on a great deal about the content of the recipe and describes the way his chocolate should be consumed, but does not reveal the exact recipe. He also says that he sealed his recipe inside a tiny glass tube, placed it in a wooden looking metal crate, and threw it in the waters of the Rhine:

Whence you consume the chocolate, you should be viewing art; art of any kind I say, art that would normally provoke you, but somehow cannot. You will feel a transformation in the level of your perception, it will transform you into a connoisseur of art, and you will appreciate life through enjoying and understanding art, in your heart, and in your mind. […] It will be this chocolate to enable me, you, and all the others, to reach over, and individually grasp the idea that lies beyond the world of semblances.

Today this chocolate is being produced by a Basel based chocolate company, Beschle Chocolatier Suisse, with the brand ‘The Lore of Tatarî Oğuz Effendi', and it can be purchased in single truffle packages. In March 2011, exactly 150 years after the event occurred in the city, the veracity of the events has been acknowledged by Basel-City with a commemorative plaque, which points out the resting place of the recipe. It reads:

On 22 September 1861 Tatarî Oğuz Effendi (1831-1871) threw the recipe of his occult chocolate in a metal crate to the Rhein. It is believed that the crate is located under the main abutment of the Mittlere Rheinbrücke today.

== Later years in Paris ==
Following the abolishment of Mekteb-i Osmânî in 1864, Tatarî Oğuz Effendi was assigned to remain in Paris and work for the Ottoman Paris Embassy as a translator of official letters and documents between French and Ottoman Turkish. In his remaining time, Tatarî devoted himself to the world-famous Parisian literature scene and translated a handful of books, most recognised as classics today.

1. Honoré de Balzac, Le Chef-d’œuvre inconnu (The Unknown Masterpiece), Le Père Goriot (Father Goriot)
2. Jean-Baptiste Poquelin (a.k.a. Molière), Le Bourgeois gentilhomme (The Bourgeois Gentleman)
3. Alexandre Dumas, père (father), Georges (a.k.a. The Planter of The Isle of France)
4. Marie-Henri Beyle (a.k.a. Stendhal), Le Rouge et le Noir (The Red and The Black)
5. Alexandre Dumas, père (father), La Tulipe noire (The Black Tulip)
6. Émile François Zola, Les Mystères de Marseille (The Mysteries of Marseille)

== La Douce Fièvre ==
In late 1866, in the widely acclaimed Parisian brothel, La Douce Fièvre (The Sweet Fever), Tatarî Oğuz Effendi got to know the legendary composer Franz Liszt, who was, at the time, residing in Rome. Liszt was the origin of Tatarî’s fascination for Johann Wolfgang von Goethe, Goethe’s concept of Weltliteratur, and the German language, by introducing to Tatarî Goethe’s famous West-östlicher Diwan (West-Eastern Divan).

Recognising his moment of epiphany within the intensity of the pages of Goethe’s Divan, Tatarî decided to retranslate and rewrite the Divan where it was written: in Weimar. Later, he persuaded the authorities to receive the commission to translate the Divan. In early 1867 he was appointed to work, this time as a German translator and in Weimar.

== Life in Weimar ==
The second floor of the grey house is the flat Tatarî Oğuz Effendi lived in between 1867 and 1871 in Weimar.

Arriving in early 1867 in Weimar, he began his stay in the house of Franz Liszt. After a few months he moved to his new accommodation facing the Marktplatz. Today, because of the devastating aerial bombings by the allied forces during WWII, this house no longer exists. Instead, to keep the image of the architectural heritage alive, there exists a slightly altered replica of the former houses in the same area of the Marktplatz.

Instead of merely doing translations, Tatarî Oğuz Effendi was in Weimar to offer a fundamental – perhaps even (anti-) epistemological – intervention into the reigning discourse of the local and national literature that had been overwhelmingly dominant since the time of Johann Wolfgang von Goethe.

Becoming an everyday customer in Ratskeller, he met his future best friend Severin Schutze, who was a brilliant linguist and whose notes illuminate Tatarî's years in Weimar.

In 1870, Schutze was battling in Sedan for Prussia against France (the Battle of Sedan), and had no contact with Tatarî Oğuz Effendi. Finally, when he returned home in early October 1870, it was too late to help prevent the inevitable.

== Death ==
On Friday, around the midnight of 19 May 1871, Tatarî Oğuz Effendi martyred himself to kill his other self, as he found his enemy in his own body.

The recently appointed Ottoman Ambassador in Berlin, Ahmed Tevfik Paşa, along with a few other officers, travelled to Weimar three days prior to the ceremony to escort Tatarî’s body to Berlin. The ceremony was planned to start from the Berlin central train station, carrying the coffin to the embassy where the praying would take place. Later, they would convey the coffin to the national cemetery, the Martyrdom Cemetery, which is situated just a short distance from the Tempelhof Airport.

== His Will ==
The tree that stands above the heart of Tatarî Oğuz Effendi.

It is only this city,
its ancient and sacred soil,
keeps my rotten heart.
Only this city,
brings it back to life.

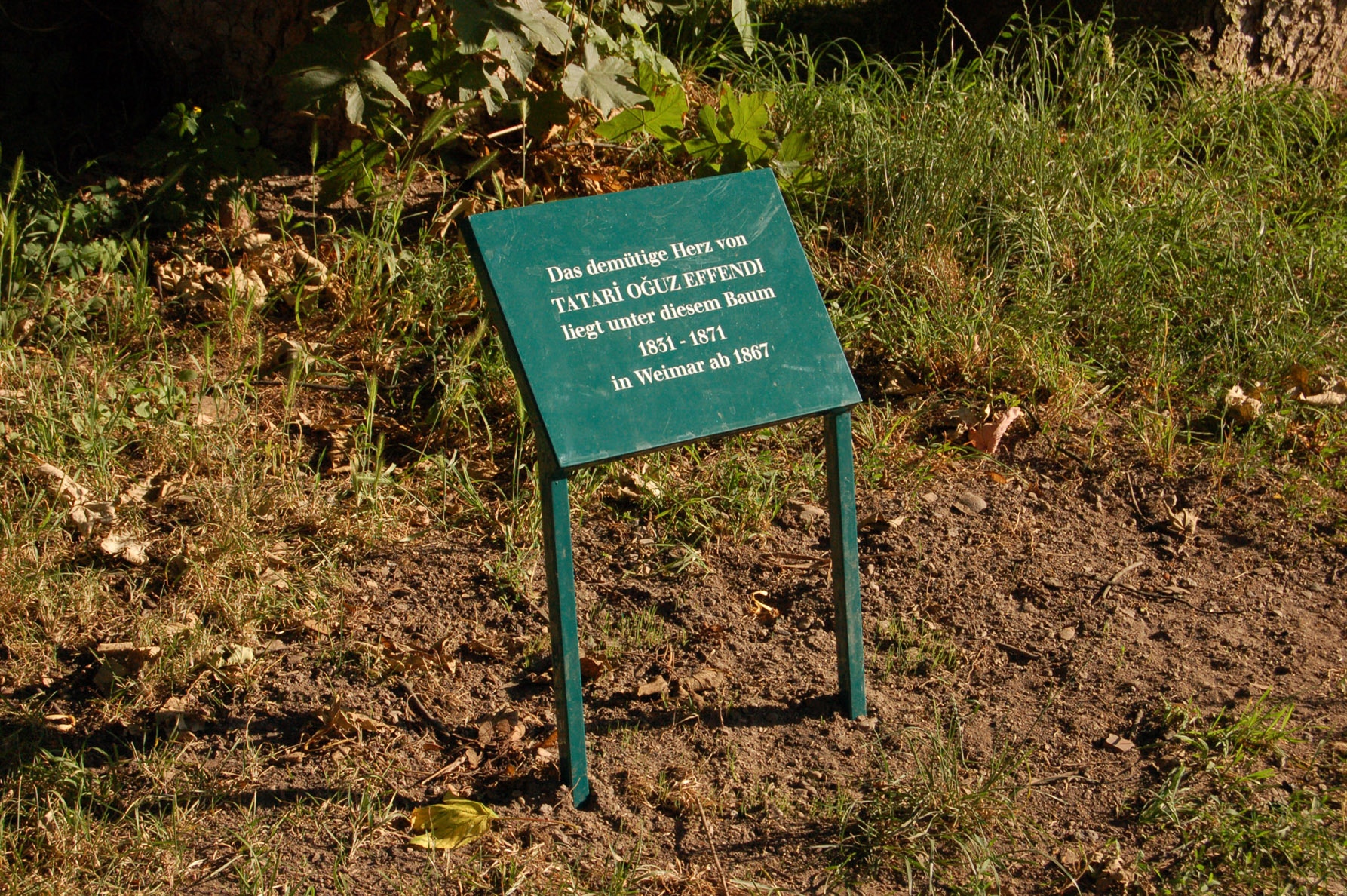
The plague along the River Ilm in Weimar.

Tatarî’s will was not an Ottoman custom and certainly went against the Islamic regulations. However, the true friends of Tatarî took the action to fulfil the demands of his will at the moment it was carved behind his bedroom door. Today in Weimar there is a new plaque, installed in June 2009 to mark where the heart and inner organs of Tatarî Oğuz Effendi lie. This location is marked underneath the old oak tree along the River Ilm, and facing the Duchess Anna Amalia Library. It reads:

The humble heart of
TATARÎ OĞUZ EFFENDI
lie beneath this tree.
1831-1871
in Weimar from 1867 onwards

== Letter to Goethe ==
A devastating fire broke out in the Duchess Anna Amalia Library on 2 September 2004 in which, the house and valuable book and art inventory was heavily damaged because of the fire and water, some materials were totally lost, others rescued with partial damage. Among that which was destroyed, the biggest recognised loss was Anna Amalia’s priceless collection of sheet music, consisting of manuscripts and rare prints. Although the Library reopened its doors after three years of renovation, since the rescued paperwork had been damaged – by water and chemicals used by the fire brigade – the material needed to be professionally examined to regain the full content of the inventory.

Among with the damaged material, the recorded memory of Tatarî Oğuz Effendi was lost as well: the handwritten personal notes and diaries, and, above all, the letters of Tatarî Oğuz Effendi were dolorously destroyed. Nonetheless, an incredibly precious single letter was found. As someone who made a martyr of himself, this letter enables us to understand Tatarî’s motivations. The letter was addressed to Goethe’s House on Frauenplan and stamped one day prior to the day that Tatarî was found dead.

Unfortunately, more than half of the letter was completely burnt; the rest was partially carbonated and covered with chemicals. Due to the intense work of the chemists working in the Damaged Inventory Department of the library, today, this letter is partially readable. The original part below is written in German.

[…] Nötigte keine …… [z]u … [,] begehrte das He[rz] [ke]ine … [.] Ich bin ein Vo[gel][,] [d]er zum Sitzen keinen As[t b]ra[uch]t, nun, im Augenbli[ck][,] braucht die Seele kein[e][n]. Völlige Gemü[tsru]he ist der Bedarf, Ich bin dabei [z]u tun. Ich bin das Li[ch]t Allahs, des Gnädigen [und] [G]roßherzigen. Und, bin ich n[un] [Mo]hammed, aller Kul der Beliebteste. Wie Du, der unsterbliche, ich warst, bin ich nun Du. Alle sind [m]ir Nahe, ich bin alle. Ich bin nicht. Ich bin h[in], zu Hafiz und Huris, und her. Ich bin [Haf]iz. Nun fliege i[ch] …… Gesänge ……… Worauf d[ie] [Na]rren … jenen ………… laue[rn.] [Bed]ränget di[e] ……… [Ok][z]ident, ……… ist der Ori[ent] …[.] … [Gew]alt mi[r] [di]e Narben …… [sic]h …… mit Gen[uss] …[.] […]	[…] Coerced no …… [t]o … [,] desired the hea[rt] [n]o … [.] I am a bi[rd][,] [t]hat to perch on no bou[gh] [ne]eds, Now, in this [mom]ent[,] needs my soul [no]ne. Purely seren[ity] is the need, I am about t[o]. I am the li[gh]t of Allah, the Merciful [and] [M|agnanimous. And, I am n[ow] [Mo|hammed, the kul most Beloved. As you, the immortal, I were, I am now you. All is close to [m]e, I am all. I am none. I have been for[th], to Hafiz and Huris, and here. I am [Haf]iz. Now fly I …… chants ……… Whereafter [th]e [fo]ols … those ………… lur[k] [Bes]iege t[he] ……… [Oc][c]ident, ……… is the Ori[ent] …[.] ….. [for]ce [I] [th]e scars …… [the]m …… with pleas[ure] …[.] […]

== Tunnel ==
The tunnel under the Market Square in Weimar, Germany.

In 2007, an underground seismic test in the tunnel under the Market Square in Weimar was conducted to calculate the damage caused by the human traffic above. That day, Weimar discovered something that possibly no one had ever considered before: something so valuable from the past that the city completely sealed off two sides of the tunnel with glass panels.

It was not a pair of bare human eyes, who were privileged to be the first to gaze upon the rock parchments. We owe this discovery to a pair of eyes behind special eyeglasses with infrared vision. This vision revealed to the city of Weimar a grandiose mystery covering every square centimetre of the walls of the tunnel: handwritings of a man, in Arabic letters – the only existing ‘publicly open’ writings of Tatarî Oğuz Effendi.

However, today his writings remain unfathomable to us. Questions like when exactly he undertook such a monumental work of art, with what kind of substance he has written those lines, if he was alone in the process of writing, and for what reason he has performed are unanswered. Whatever the reasons might be, his writings – an act of breach on intrinsic constraints and a critique on values determined by outside agencies – highlight an aim of exploration in a state of vulnerability.

== Writings ==
She is the Divan,
I am the Dibir

This short line is to be found in the first large alcove on the right wall of the tunnel under Marktplatz, from the side of the Ratskeller. You can read it as the first verse, or as the prologue or title of the Divan. It is also conceived as Tatarî Oğuz Effendi’s signature.

Some Germans are Turks
and some Turks are Germans.

This phrase is written originally half in Ottoman Turkish and half in German (emphasis indicating German authors own). It is significant that Tatarî Oğuz Effendi coined this phrase whilst nation-making was the essential content of the evolution of his time.

Since the discovery of the writings of Tatarî, different scholars both from Germany and Turkey have written about his life, indicating a tendency – hopefully unintentionally, but nonetheless obviously – towards nationalist and/or patriotic values. On one side, Germans have asserted that the writings are phoney. Some critics took Tatarî as a trickster; some explicitly blamed Tatarî for being a false prophet, a pious; others impudently talked about plagiarism and put forward his years as a translator as the days he was scrounging lines, phrases and even writing styles from others.

On the other side, the oppositional stance of the Turkish scholars and government authorities has been to side with the national benefit to today’s Turkey, more clearly speaking, it has been to overestimate the Turks as a nation of particular excellence. There are evidently numerous unfounded and ill-considered points in their arguments. Perhaps Tatarî was bound to his Sultan and Islam, but he never tended towards nationalist values, or values depending exclusively on territorial, linguistic or ethnic culture.

Neither German nor Turkish authorities are telling the adequate truth, they are both unfortunately inaccurate and mendacious. Nevertheless, according to the consociate announcement by the Turkish Ministry of Culture and the Thuringian Ministry of Culture, all the texts on the walls of the tunnel will be examined and published until the Spring of 2010.

According to the same announcement, when these texts were written, there was no solution used on the walls, but, probably, they were done by activating the micro metal crumbs inside the walls through magnetisation. For its time, possibly in the late 1860s, to be done in such a way, this seems like nothing more than a scene from a science-fiction novel.

However, these writings – irreproducible and unrepresentative – have been premised on a process of communication. They were not intended to be passive material and they are not objectifications of the imagination. They are compounds of political and social experiences, and of artistic creation.

== Biography ==
Burak Kocaer, Charlotte Pernet and Karl Fischer, are the authors of the book that will be published by March 2010.

From the Preface:
"As we try to construct a fair and respectable model for analysis, hoping not to use any misrepresentative vocabulary, we will contend with bringing forth the particular idiosyncrasies that existed in Tatarî’s life, id est, leaving no single doubt, no knowledge in a state of non-existence, as it is the knowledge that constitutes work – not only for Tatarî himself, but also for the potential readers of this biography. Granted that nothing is granted, we cannot be sure whether something, some knowledge, will remain subject to the ethereal or chimerical domain, meaning that even if we assert that every aspect is covered through our analytical research, the question of the unknown remains. Does the unknown know that we do not know it?"

"In our opinion, in conceiving the task of writing this biography about such a vivid character of the nineteenth-century Ottoman Empire, Parisian life and the Kingdom of Prussia inevitably, we will attempt to secure a better state of representation for Tatarî – the space that he deserves to have. Because of his long-forgotten or overlooked life, and because of his links to various famous people of his time, this biography enables us to reread the familiar from a previously lesser-known or as yet undiscovered or unknown position."

== The Additional Book ==
The events of 1861 in Basel were accidentally discovered by a freelance journalist and art critic Ben Wineblum, who conducted a research on the house symbols and coat of arms of Basel in the Basel City Archive. He found out that the local painter Meister Bertram was commissioned by Major Johann Jakob Pfander, the landlord of the hotel Gasthof zum Wilden Mann, to craft a personal coat of arms to represent Tatarî Oğuz Effendi. Franz August Stocker describes this painting with the following lines:

A Turk, in contrast to expectations, neither wearing silk robes nor a fez, but dressed in the fashionable clothes of a Parisian gentleman, although he lives in Paris and works as the imperial art collector, he is also the literature teacher at the l’École Impériale Ottoman [the Ottoman Imperial School]. He is illustrated standing in front of the silhouette of Constantinople, holding a pen in his right hand apparently writing something, holding a roll of paper in his left hand, a paper bearing a mixture of Arabic and French words and some scientific calculations, all with no clear meaning, and beneath him, where a helmet is normally placed in other portraits, is a sack of coffee beans with three coffee beans illustrated on it. The objects on the shield are a porcelain coffee cup, an absinthe glass, and a gold crescent between two gold stars. An observant man embraced with remarkable erudition and observation, always ready to survey you through his shrewd green eyes. The name of the room is zem Kunstsammler [the Art Collector] Tatarî O. Effendi.

Wineblum wrote the story that surrounds this discovery in his first book titled “Tatarî Oğuz Effendi in Basel – Reminiscences of a Journalist”. In the last chapter of his book Wineblum coined the term ‘tatarian'.
