= Tatari multispinosus =

Scientific classification
- Kingdom: Animalia
- Phylum: Arthropoda
- Subphylum: Chelicerata
- Class: Arachnida
- Order: Araneae
- Infraorder: Araneomorphae
- Family: Salticidae
- Genus: Tatari; Berland, 1938
- Species: T. multispinosus

Binomial name
- Tatari multispinosus Berland, 1938

Genus of spiders

Tatari is a monotypic genus of jumping spiders containing the single species, Tatari multispinosus. It was first described by Lucien Berland in 1938, and is found only on Vanuatu. The species name is derived from Latin, meaning "having multiple spines".
