= Tissue-to-air ratio =

Tissue-to-air ratio (TAR) is a term used in radiotherapy treatment planning to help calculate absorbed dose to water in conditions other than those directly measured.

== Definition ==
The TAR at a point in a water phantom irradiated by a photon beam is taken to be the ratio of the total absorbed dose at that point to the absorbed dose at the same point in a minimal-scatter phantom with just-sufficient build-up.

Tissue-air ratio is defined as the ratio of the dose to water at a given depth to the dose in air measured with a buildup cap:

$TAR={{D(f,z)} \over {D(f,0)}}$

where D(f,z) is the dose at a given depth z and distance focus-detector f; and D(f,0) is the dose in air (z=0).

- TAR increases with increasing beam energy because higher energy radiation is more penetrating
- TAR decreases with depth because of attenuation
- TAR increases with field size due to increased scatter contribution

Measurements for each are taken using an ion chamber for identical source to detector distances and field sizes.

== See also ==
- Dosimetry
- Percentage depth dose curve
