= Mercado Agrícola de Montevideo =

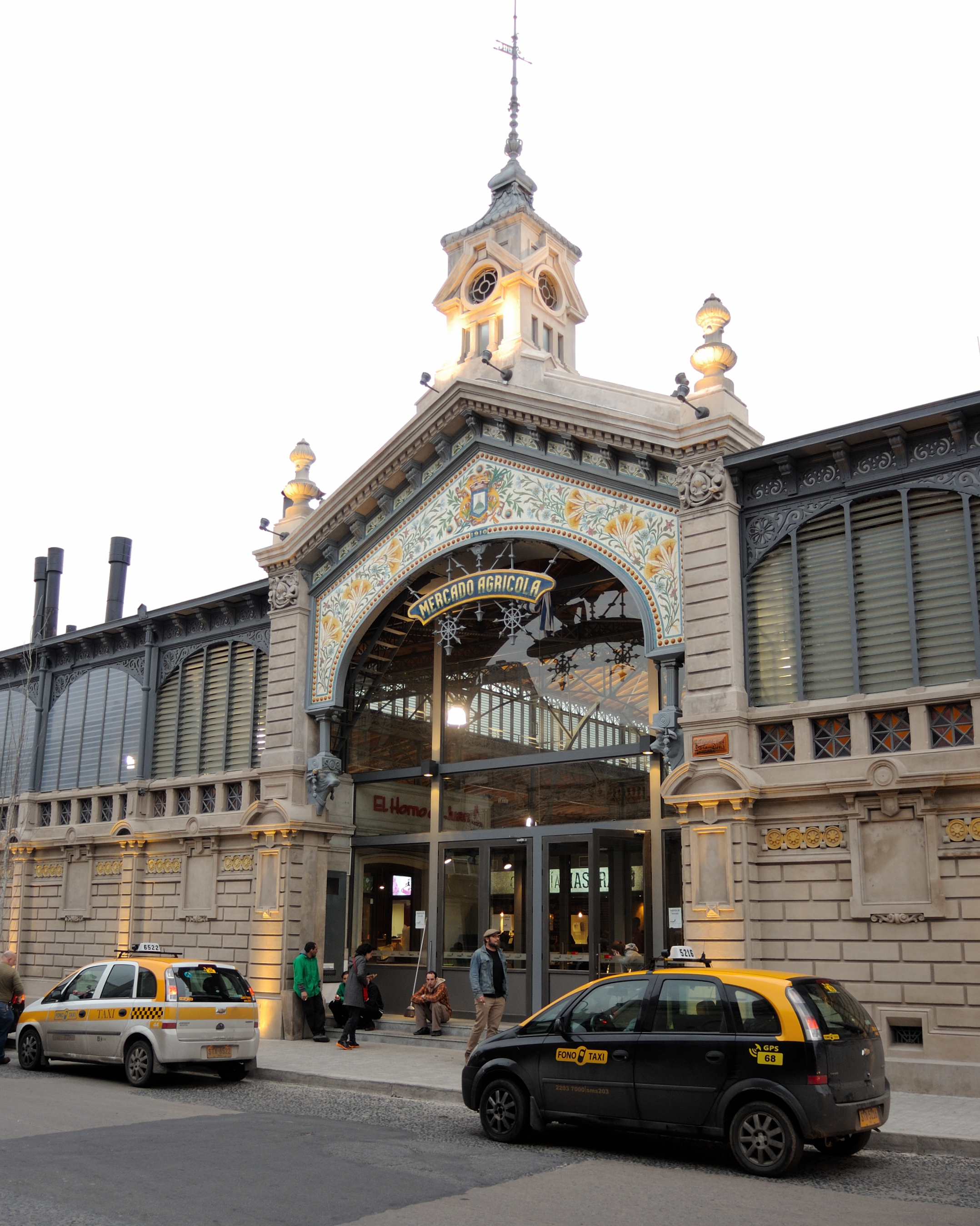
- Mercado Agrícola in 2013
- Location: 2220 José Terra Street; 34°53′13″S 56°11′00″W
- Architect: Antonino Vázquez and Silvio Geranio
- Environment: Covered
- Website: www.mam.com.uy
- Interactive map of Mercado Agrícola de Montevideo

The Mercado Agrícola de Montevideo (MAM) (English: Montevideo Agricultural Market) is a historic enclosed market in the Aguada neighborhood of Montevideo, Uruguay. Built in the 1910s and reopened in 2013, it combines a variety of permanent shops selling fresh produce, butcheries, and other specialty food stores typical of a fruits and vegetables wholesale marketplace, along with general service providers and several restaurants and cafés.

== History ==
Construction of the Montevideo Agricultural Market began on 30 December 1906, on land donated by landowner Carlos H. Crocker. The project, designed by architect Antonino Vázquez with later contributions from Silvio Geranio, was conceived in line with the architectural trends of the period, drawing particular inspiration from European iron-market structures such as Les Halles in Paris.

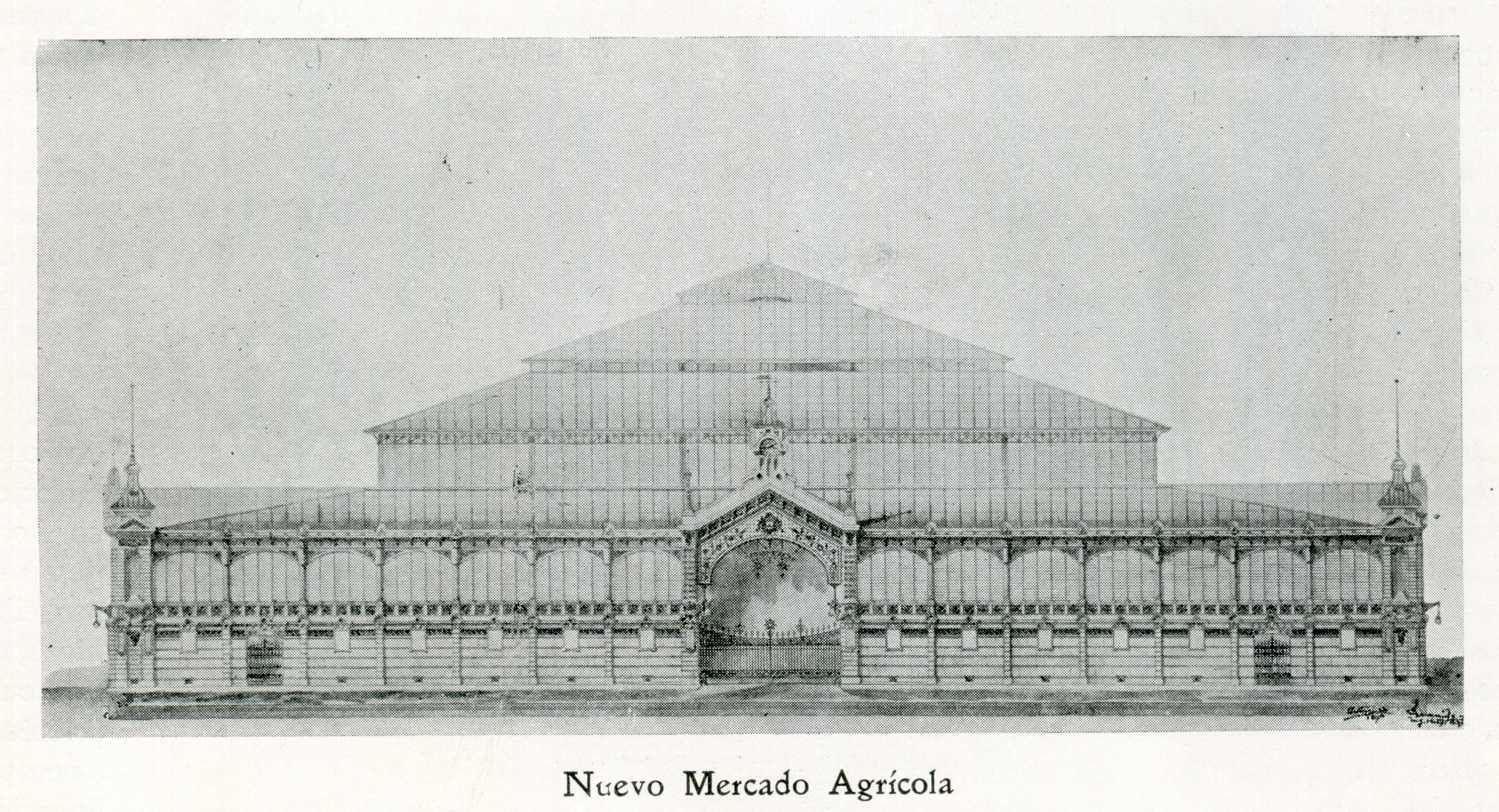
Mercado Agrícola in 1910

The main iron structure, covering 5,867 square meters, had originally been used at the International Exhibition in Brussels and was gifted to President José Batlle y Ordóñez during an official visit to Belgium. Transported from England, it was assembled on-site in Montevideo using cast-iron columns and steel trusses. The building was officially inaugurated on 30 November 1912, and became operational the following year. From its inception, the market was regarded as one of the most significant examples of its kind in Latin America and marked the last major iron market hall constructed in the city.

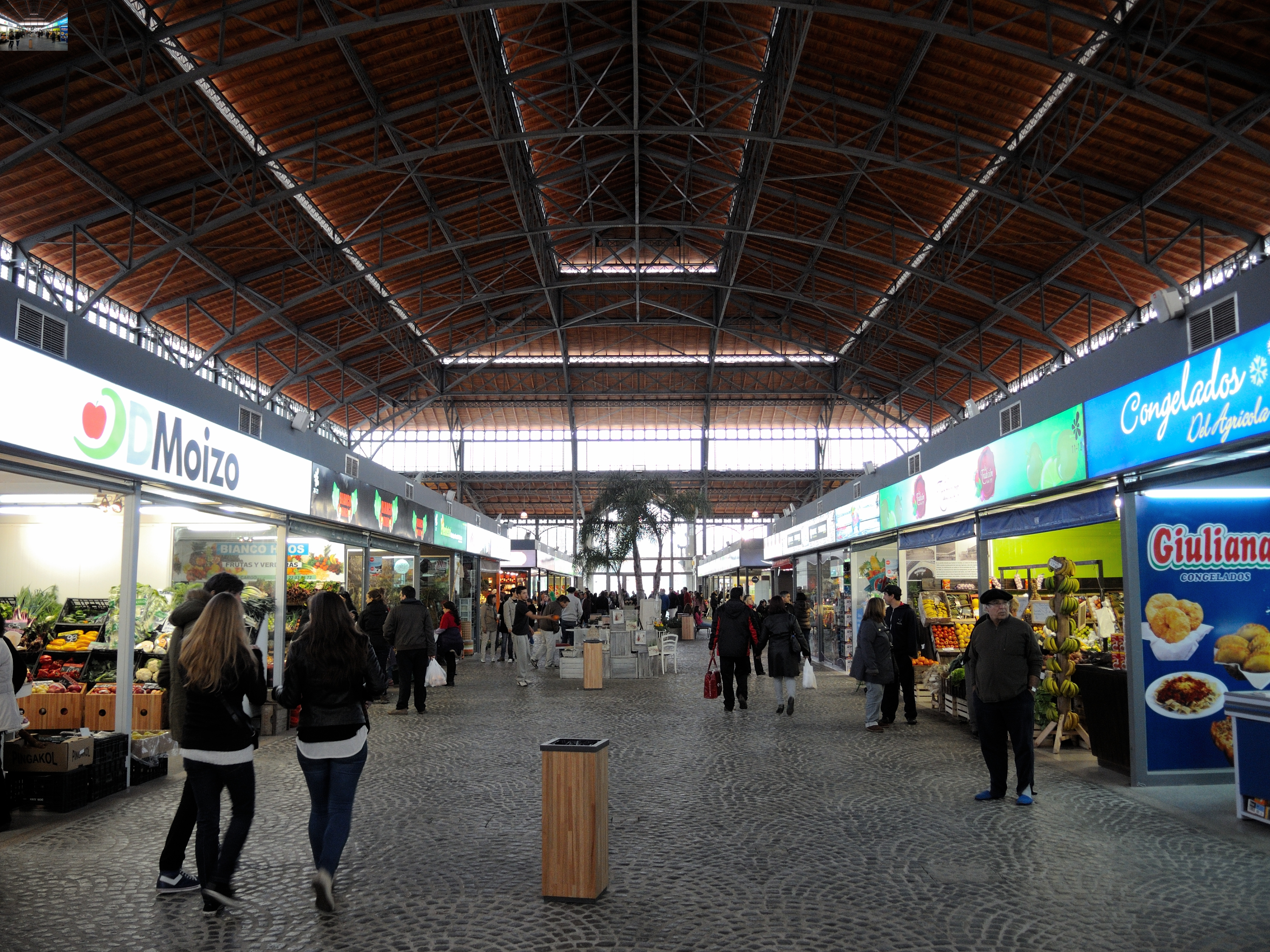
Market's interior

In 2010, a comprehensive restoration plan was approved. The building was reopened in June 2013, following extensive architectural intervention. Since then, it has operated as a retail market primarily focused on the sale of fruits, vegetables, fresh produce, and other food items, and includes a gastronomic area along with shops offering handicrafts and souvenirs. The main entrance features a decorative composition in European polychrome ceramic, prominently displaying the coat of arms of Montevideo, flanked by floral motifs. This façade is further distinguished by a central tower resembling a bell tower, topped with a spire, a wind rose, and a weather vane.

In 1999 the building was declared a National Historic Monument.

== Gallery ==
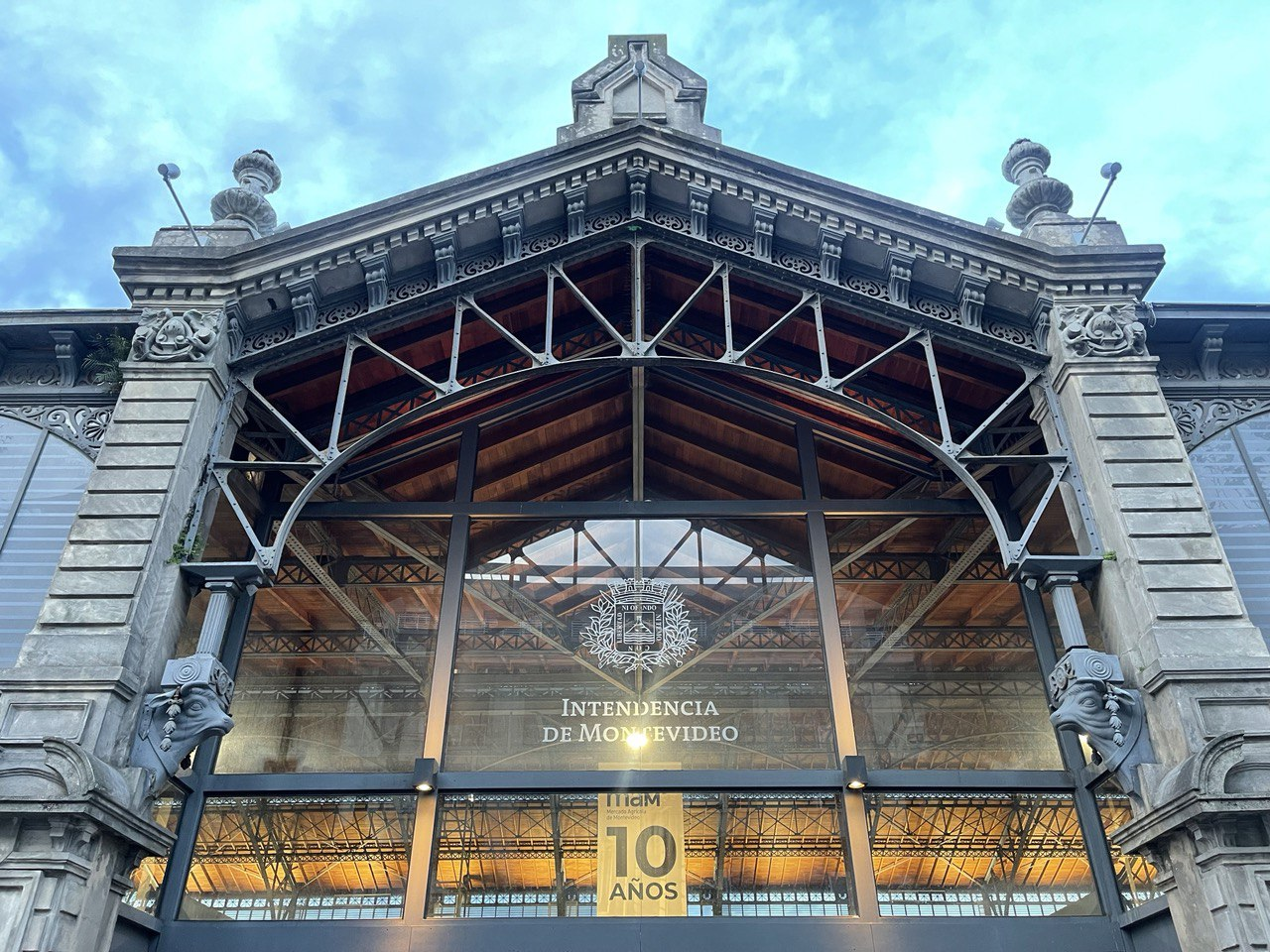
Main façade

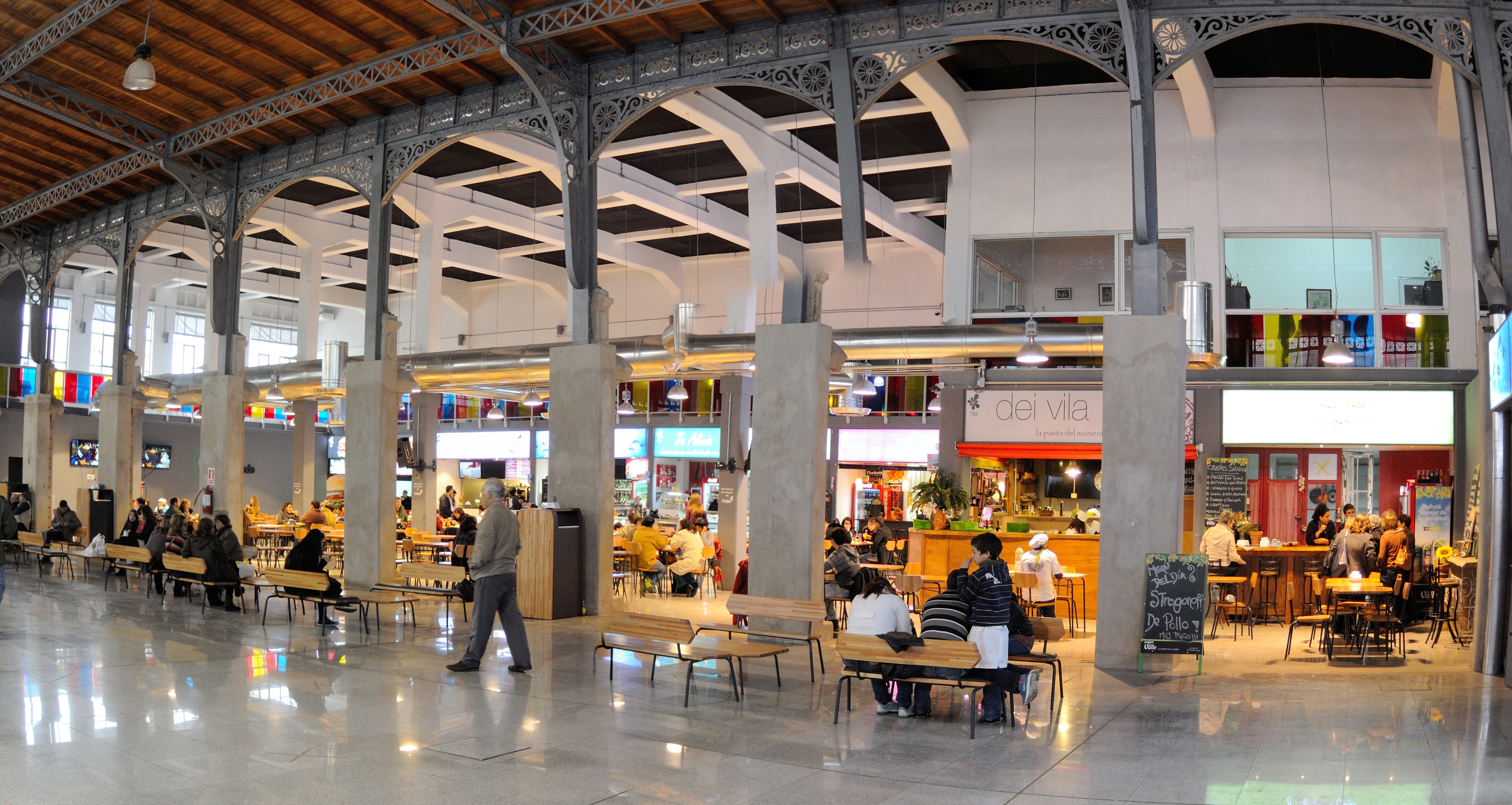
Food court

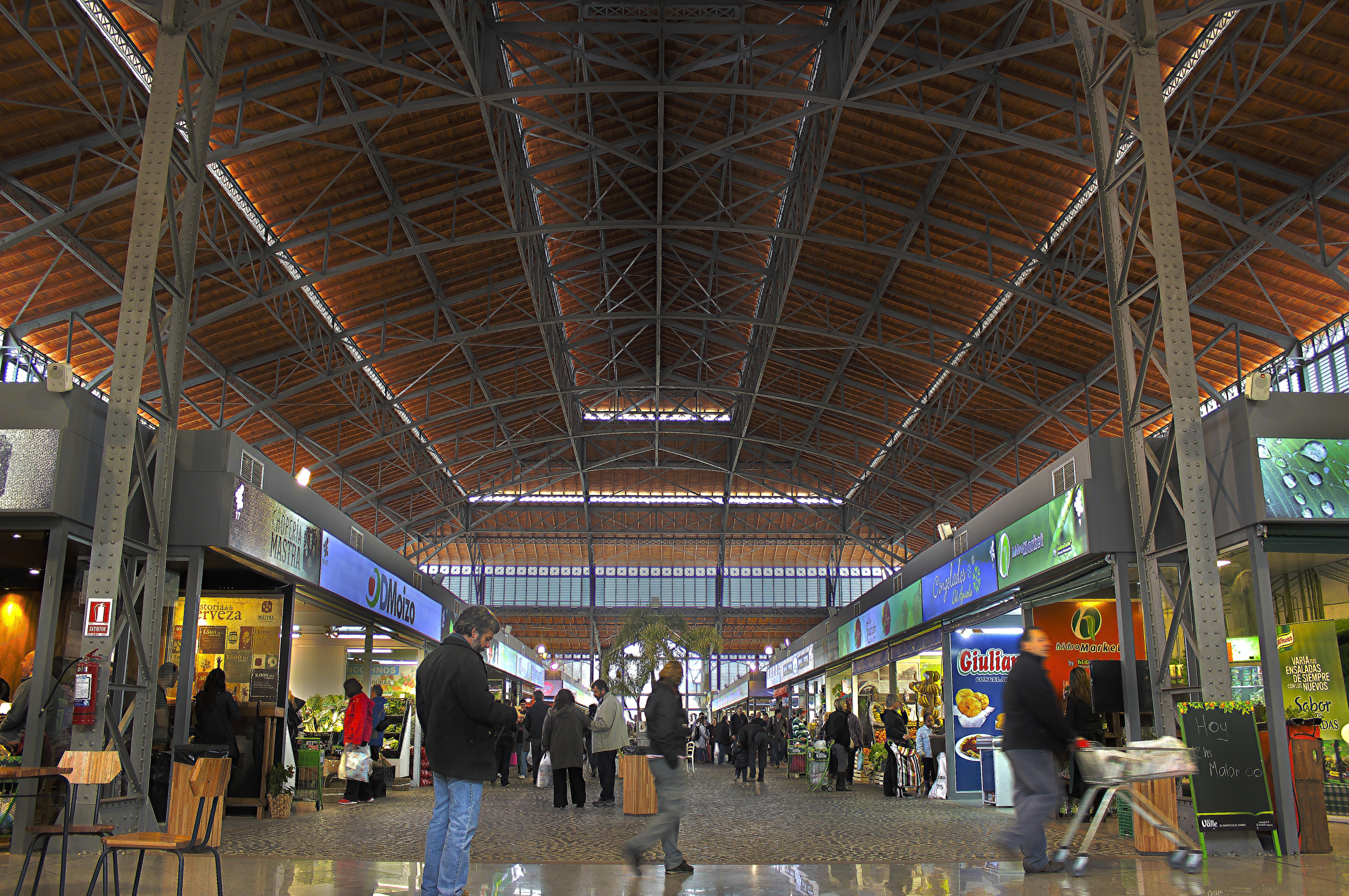
Market's corridor

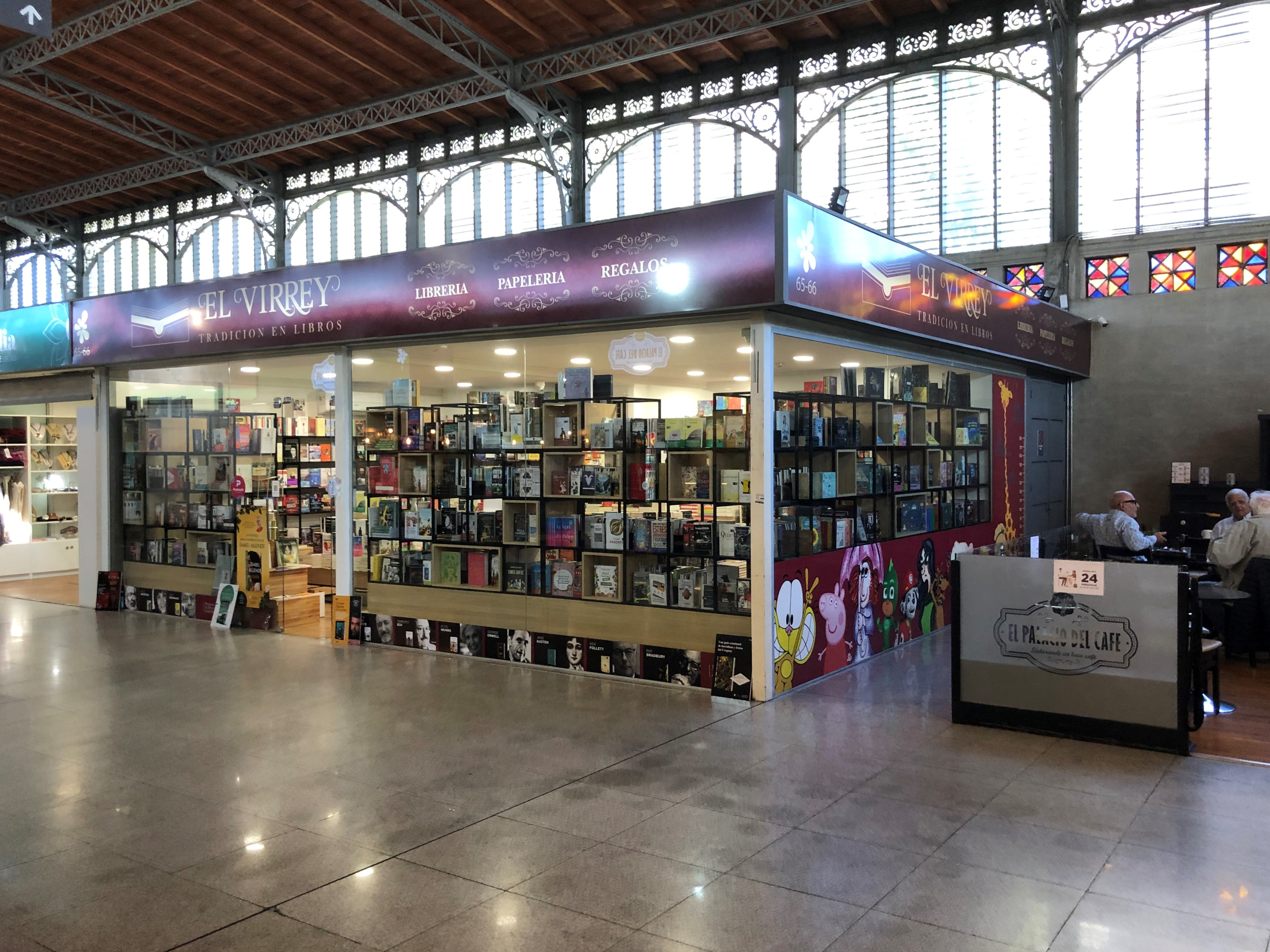
Market's stores

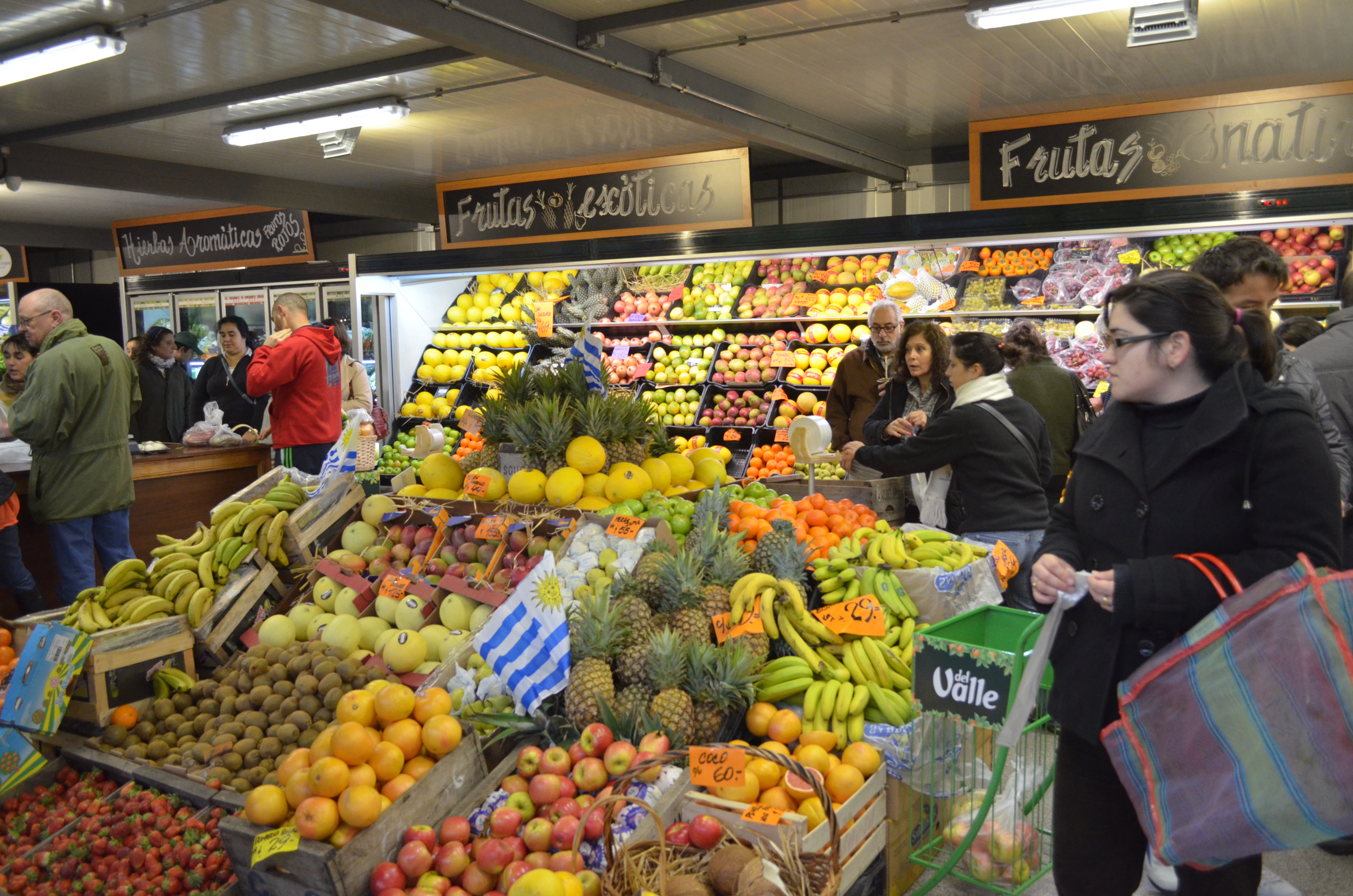
Stall
