= Tar Island =

Coordinates: 44.391°N 75.912°W

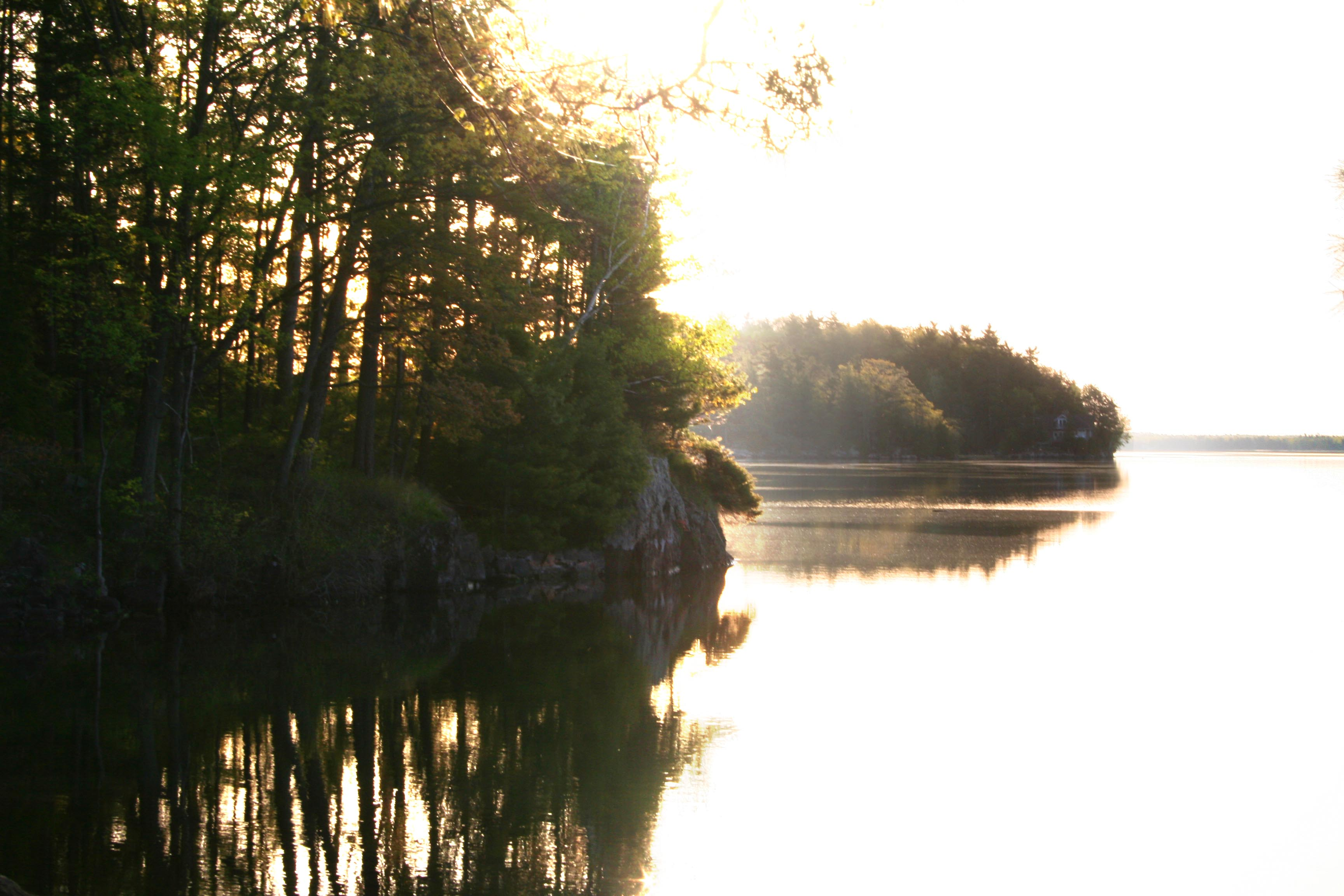
Tar Island in the foreground, looking south over the St. Lawrence River.

Tar Island is an island near the town of Rockport in the Canadian waters of the St. Lawrence River, and a part of the Thousand Islands, a freshwater archipelago.

== Geography ==
Tar Island is about three kilometers long and a third of a kilometer wide, and separated from the northern shore of the river by sixty meters. It measures 262 acres (106 hectares) in area and 8.0 kilometers (5.0 miles) in perimeter. Situated on a small unnamed island near the head of Tar Island is an automatic lighthouse directing traffic for the Canadian Middle Channel of the St. Lawrence.

== Natural history ==
A large deposit of black tourmaline is located just southeast of the island, intermixed with white quartz, cream colored feldspar, and green-yellow mica. The waters around Tar Island are home to American eel, now endangered.

== History ==
Tar Island was a site of Iroquois settlement, and contains arrowheads, bones, and a star painted in red ochre. According to the 18th century French captain Pierre Pouchot, a narrows between the island and Canadian shore was previously called Petit Detroit by the Iroquois, and used for baptizing newcomers to the river. During the War of 1812 Tar Island was the site of the 19 June 1814 ambush and capture of the British gunboat Black Snake, along with her captain Herman Landon, by American sailing master Francis Gregory.

Inhabitants of Tar Island have included entomologist William Steel Creighton, industrialist Robert Hewitt, farmer Ralph Hodge (described in Thompson's Soul of the River,) and videogame designer Brian Reynolds. Farming (including products such as corn) has not been practiced on Tar Island since 1990, with land now primarily used for summer cottages.

== See also ==
- Iroquois
- Mississaugas
- Mohawk people
- Oneida people
- Grenadier Island (Saint Lawrence River)
