= Tatar, Jabrayil =

Tatar
- Location within Azerbaijan
- Coordinates: 39°26′42″N 46°55′25″E
- Country: Azerbaijan
- District: Jabrayil
- Time zone: UTC+4 (AZT)
  - Summer (DST): UTC+5 (AZT)

Tatar is a village in the Jabrayil District of Azerbaijan.
