= Tartarium =

Type of fabric

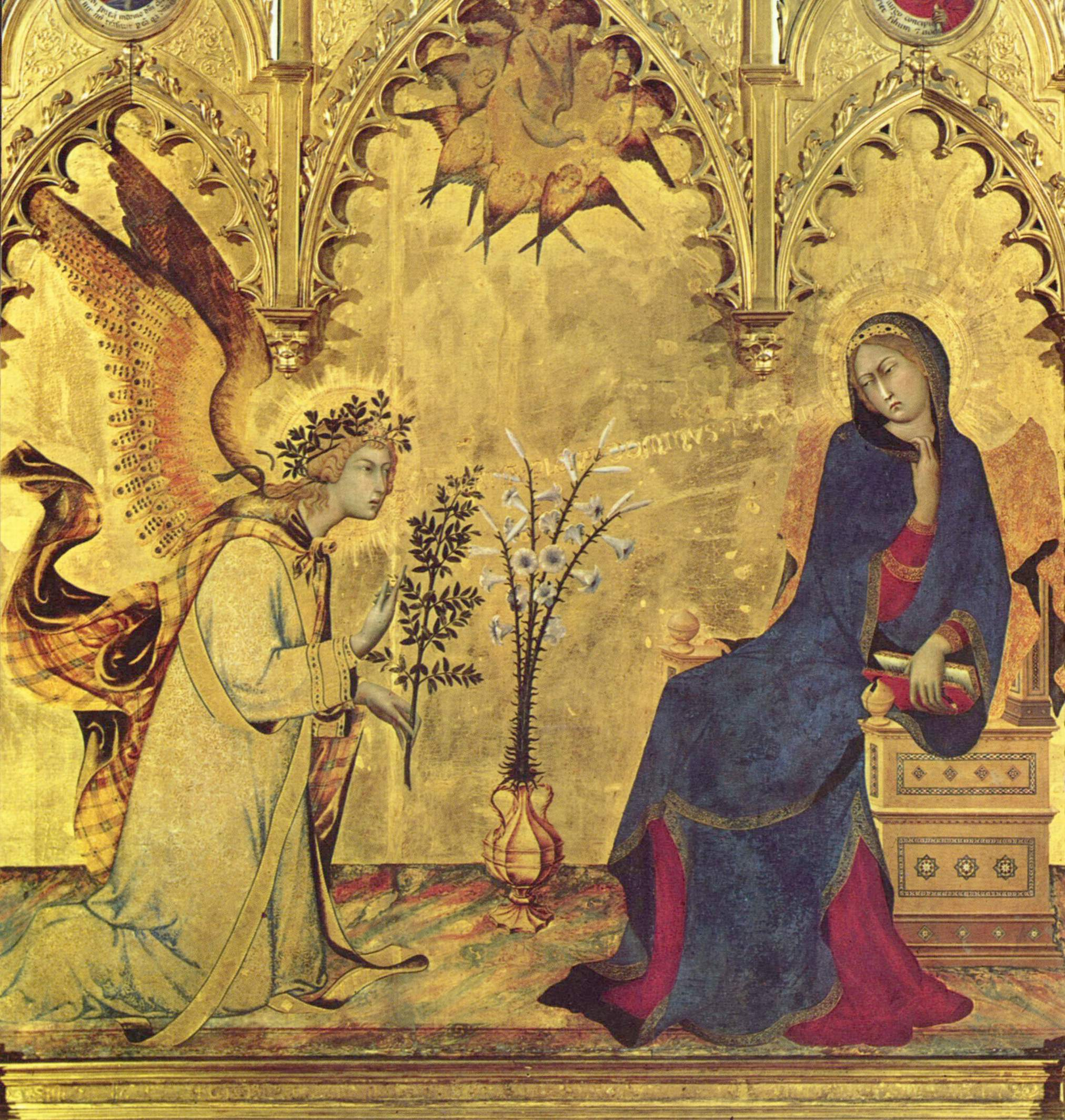
Small-patterned Tartar-style textiles are worn by Angel Gabriel in the Annunciation by Simone Martini (1333).

Tartarium, also known as cloth of Tars, was a luxurious textile during the Middle Ages. It was characterized by its high cost and was typically crafted through the combination of various materials.

== Tartar cloths ==
In Dante's time, the term "Tartar cloths" referred to rich fabrics of Oriental origin that were brought through Tartary from China and its borders. These cloths were known for their fine material, bright colors, and intricate designs, which were created either by weaving different colors on the loom or through other methods. Tartarium was a highly expensive fabric made of royal purple color. It was likely crafted by combining silk and of goat's hair from Thibet.

Marco Polo, a Venetian merchant who lived from 1254 to 1324, identified Nasich and Naques as types of textiles made using gold, and Tartarium was one among the examples. Polo's writings suggest that the fabric was crafted using a technique that involved weaving strips of gold into it. This is clearly evident in his description of the Great Khan's attire on his birthday, which he notes was made of the finest robes fashioned from beaten gold.

As per the glossary that accompanies the "Liber Custumarum" and the wardrobe account of RIC III, the fabric known as Tartaryn, which was utilized as a lining material, was composed of a blend of linen and wool. It was markedly different from the earlier fabrics produced in Tars.

== Origin and naming ==
According to Warton, the term "Tars" does not refer to the city of Tarsus in Cilicia, but instead, it is an abbreviated form of "Tartarin" or "Tartarium". The wardrobe accounts of Edward III of England indicate that "Tars" was an expensive item, as exemplified by the entry detailing a blue tartaryn jupon embellished with silver buckles, pendants, and garters. Boccaccio, in his commentary, describes the Tartarium cloths as being so expertly woven that no painter could match their quality with a brush.

The origin and naming of Tartarium cloth are subjects of conflicting accounts among the sources. According to Colonel Yule, Tartarium cloth was not named after Tartary because of its place of production, but rather because it was brought to Europe from China through the territories of the Tatar rulers.

Du Cange defined it as a fine cloth manufactured in Tartary. Skinner suggests that Tartarium cloth may have originated from Tortona, which is a city in the Milanese region.

== Mentions ==
In the literary work, "The Floure and the Leafe", Chaucer made reference to Tartarium, a type of fabric. In "The Flower and the Leaf", we encounter tapestries referred to as "verd", due to the abundance of trees present on them. These tapestries were adorned with a minstrel-gallery running along their length. The gallery was used as a gathering spot, where a group of individuals, wearing white cloaks and crowned with fresh oak garlands, congregated. They carried trumpets adorned with rich tartarium banners, displaying their lords' arms. The trumpets were decorated with wide collars embellished with large pearls, as no expense was spared in their creation.

Encyclopædia Britannica has mentioned Tartarium in the volume 12 under section of Gold.

In medieval Europe, cloth and fabrics infused with gold and silver threads were favored by royal figures and important religious leaders for their ceremonial attire, costly decorations, and hangings. These textiles were known by different names such as ciclatoun, tartarium, naques or nac, baudekin or baldachin (Baghdad), and tissue, and typically incorporated gold threads in conjunction with other materials.

The inventories documenting the effects of Henry V make reference to russet and red tarteryns. Additionally, it is noted that the coote armor he wore was made of a Tars cloth.

== See also ==
- Mongol elements in Western medieval art § Mongol Empire "Tatar" textiles in medieval art
- Tissue (cloth)
