= Time at risk =

Time at Risk (TaR) is a time-based risk measure designed for corporate finance practice.

TaR represents certain quantile for a given probability distribution, so is similar to Value at Risk (VaR). However, TaR measures risk amount as time(time until an adverse event) rather than value (loss amount).

== Definition and examples ==
Mathematical definition of TaR is same as that of VaR.

However, value-based random variable is replaced with time-based one, and given time-horizon is replaced with given finance structure.

Examples comparing VaR and TaR are as below.

- “An insurance company's 90% VaR is 10 million dollars for 1-year insurance risk.”

This means it is 90% probability that insurance claim payout would be below 10 million dollars; so if the insurer has accumulated 10 million dollars in cash, it would be 90% safe.

- “An insurance company's 90% TaR is 3 years for liquidity risk under current finance structure.”

This means it is 90% probability that net liquid assets(= liquid assets - volatile liabilities) would not be run out within 3 years; so for 3 years, the insurer under current finance structure would be 90% safe.

For confidence level α,

- VaR can be interpreted as “Required minimum capital to sustain loss”
- TaR can be interpreted as “Maximum period of time that an adverse event would not occur or would be prevented (ie. safe against the event)”

Thus for same α, lower VaR means lower risk and higher TaR means lower risk.

== Applications ==
TaR is a simple measure for whom are familiar with VaR, so is easy to communicate by. TaR also can be used for supplementary purpose to VaR analysis.

Applying TaR in financial models, practitioners can analyze sources of risks and take remedial actions in corporate finance planning; not only for liquidity risk mentioned above, but also for any risks that demands time-based analysis.

When TaR is applied to a household's financial planning it can measure longevity risk, and TaR in this case is referred to as Age at Risk (AaR).

== See also ==
- Age at risk
