= Tatar-e Sofla, East Azerbaijan =

Tatar-e Sofla تاتارسفلي
- Village
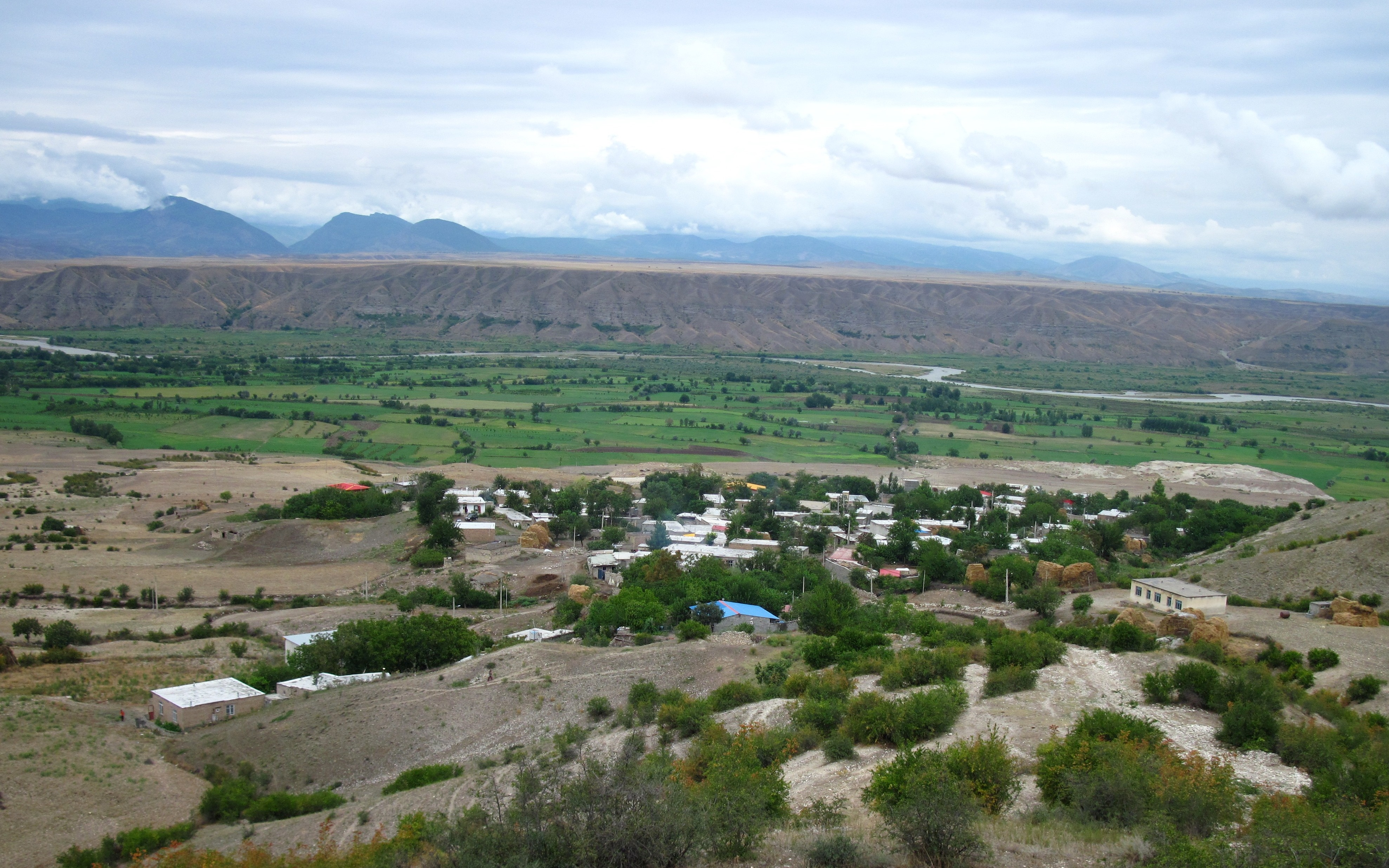
- The village in August 2013

- Location within Iran
- Coordinates: 39°03′21″N 46°47′29″E
- Country: Iran
- Province: East Azerbaijan
- County: Khoda Afarin
- Bakhsh: Minjavan
- Rural District: Minjavan-e Sharqi

Population (2006)
  - Total: 348
- Time zone: UTC+3:30 (IRST)
  - Summer (DST): UTC+4:30 (IRDT)

Tatar-e Sofla (Persian: تاتار سفلی, also Romanized as Tātār-e Soflá; also known as Perebay-Tatar, Pirabai, Pīrehbāy, and Tātār-e Pā’īn) is a village in Minjavan-e Sharqi Rural District, Minjavan District, Khoda Afarin County, East Azerbaijan Province, Iran. At the 2006 census, its population was 348, in 84 families.

== Situation ==
The online edition of the Dehkhoda Dictionary, quoting Iranian Army files, reports a population of 195 people in the late 1940s. At the 2006 census, its population was 348, in 84 families. According to more recent statistics (2012) the population is 271 people in 84 families. This indicates a sharp decline in population, perhaps due to the migration of young people in the pursuit of jobs in larger cities.

Before the Iranian Revolution, A small contingent of the Royal Gendarmerie was located in the village with the task of guarding the borders with the Soviet Union, conscripting local males, and settling the disputes between villagers and nomadic pastoralists.
