= Tatar, Qubadli =

Tatar
- Location within Azerbaijan
- Coordinates: 39°09′42″N 46°42′06″E
- Country: Azerbaijan
- Rayon: Qubadli
- Time zone: UTC+4 (AZT)
  - Summer (DST): UTC+5 (AZT)

Tatar (also, Dagdaganly-Tatar, Kara-Tatar, and Tatar, Razvaliny) is a village in the Qubadli Rayon of Azerbaijan.
