= Tatar, Zangilan =

Tatar
- Interactive map of Tatar
- Rayon: Zangilan
- Time zone: UTC+4 (AZT)

Tatar is a village located in the administrative-territorial district of the village of Jahangirbeyli in Zangilan district of Azerbaijan.

== History ==
According to the “Code of statistical data of the Transcaucasian region population, extracted from the family lists of 1886”, in the village of Tatar 2nd of Zangilan rural district of the Zangezur district, the Elizavetpol province, there were 75 dym and 345 Azerbaijanis (in the source - "Tatar") who were Shiites by religion. The entire population was made by landowner peasants.

According to the results of the Azerbaijani agricultural census of 1921, villages Ashaghy Tatar I and Yukhary Tatar of Zangilan rural district of Gubadli district, Azerbaijan SSR were inhabited by 245 people (91 households), the predominant nationality was Azerbaijani Turks.

During the First Karabakh War in 1993, the village was occupied by Armenian armed forces. After the occupation, the village was destroyed.

On 22 October 2020, during the Second Karabakh War, the Azerbaijani Army regained the control over the village of Tatar and liberated it.
