= Tatar-e Olya, East Azerbaijan =

Village in East Azerbaijan province, Iran

Tatar-e Olya Persian: تاتارعليا
- Village
- Location within Iran
- Coordinates: 39°02′24″N 46°46′24″E
- Country: Iran
- Province: East Azerbaijan
- County: Khoda Afarin
- District: Manjavan
- Rural District: Manjavan-e Sharqi

Population (2016)
  - Total: 358
- Time zone: UTC+3:30 (IRST)

Tatar-e Olya (Persian: تاتارعليا) (Note: Also romanized as Tātār-e ‘Olyā; also known as Chaindara, Chalandara-Tatar, Tahtarī Kandareh, Tātār, Tātār-e Bālā, and Tatari) is a village in Manjavan-e Sharqi Rural District of Manjavan District in Khoda Afarin County, East Azerbaijan province, Iran.

== Demographics ==
=== Population ===
At the time of the 2006 National Census, the village's population was 372 in 84 households, when it was in the former Khoda Afarin District of Kaleybar County. The following census in 2011 counted 347 people in 91 households, by which time the district had been separated from the county in the establishment of Khoda Afarin County. The rural district was transferred to the new Manjavan District. The 2016 census measured the population of the village as 358 people in 118 households.
