= Setan (village) =

Setan ستن
- Village
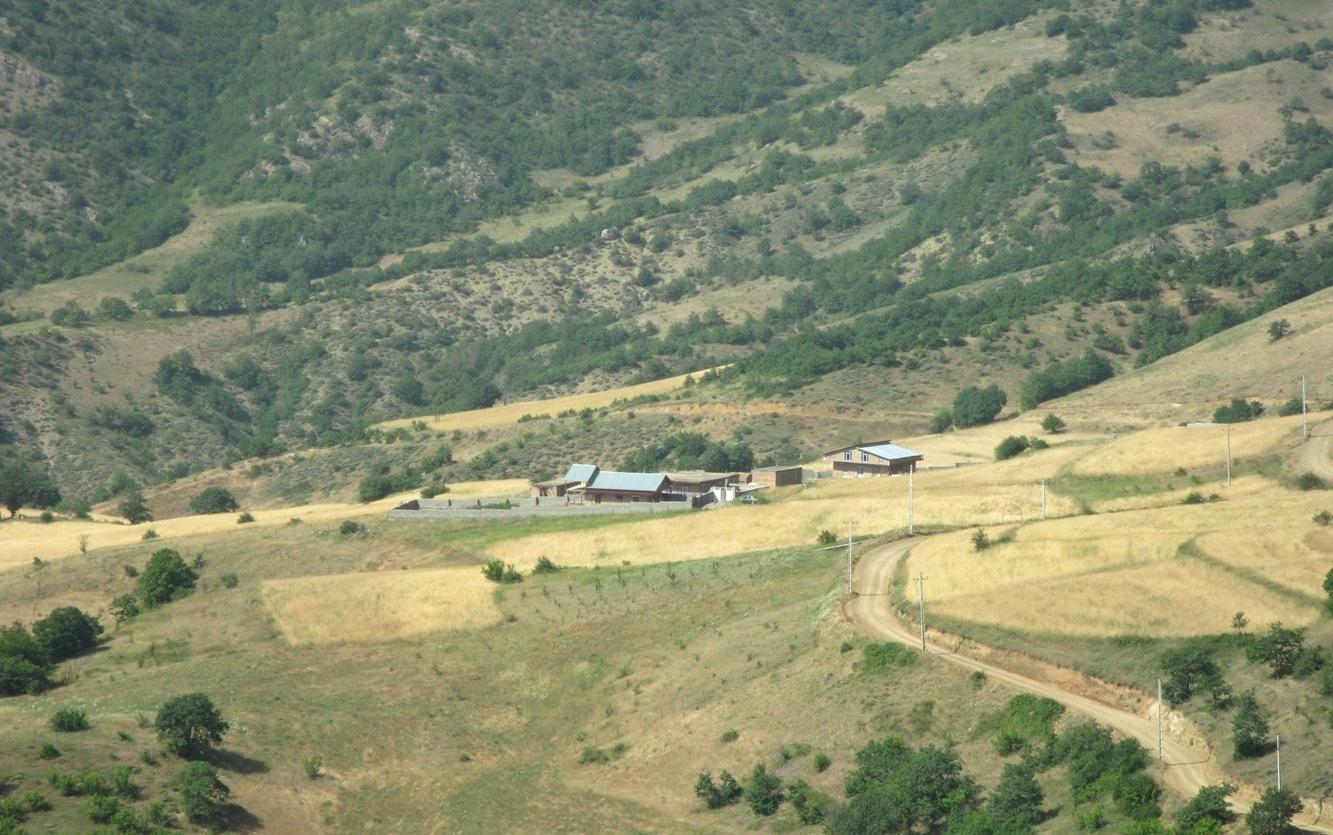
- Village view in June 2011

- Location within Iran
- Coordinates: 38°59′19″N 46°44′21″E
- Country: Iran
- Province: East Azerbaijan
- County: Khoda Afarin
- Bakhsh: Minjavan
- Rural District: Minjavan-e Gharbi

Population (2006)
  - Total: 236
- Time zone: UTC+3:30 (IRST)
  - Summer (DST): UTC+4:30 (IRDT)

Setan (Persian: ستن; also known as Sūtanī and Syutany) is a village in Minjavan-e Gharbi Rural District, Minjavan District, Khoda Afarin County, East Azerbaijan Province, Iran. At the 2006 census, its population was 236, in 58 families. This is a significant drop as compared to the population of the village in early 1960s, which was 340. Still, the decline is moderate as previously more prosperous villages of Arasbaran region, such as Abbasabad, experienced on average fourfold reduction in their population and some nearby villages were abandoned. In the wake of White Revolution (early 1960s) a clan of Mohammad Khanlu tribe, comprising 120 households used Setan and Masjedlu as their winter quarters.
