= Tu Ali-ye Olya =

Tu Ali-ye Olya طوعلی عليا
- Village
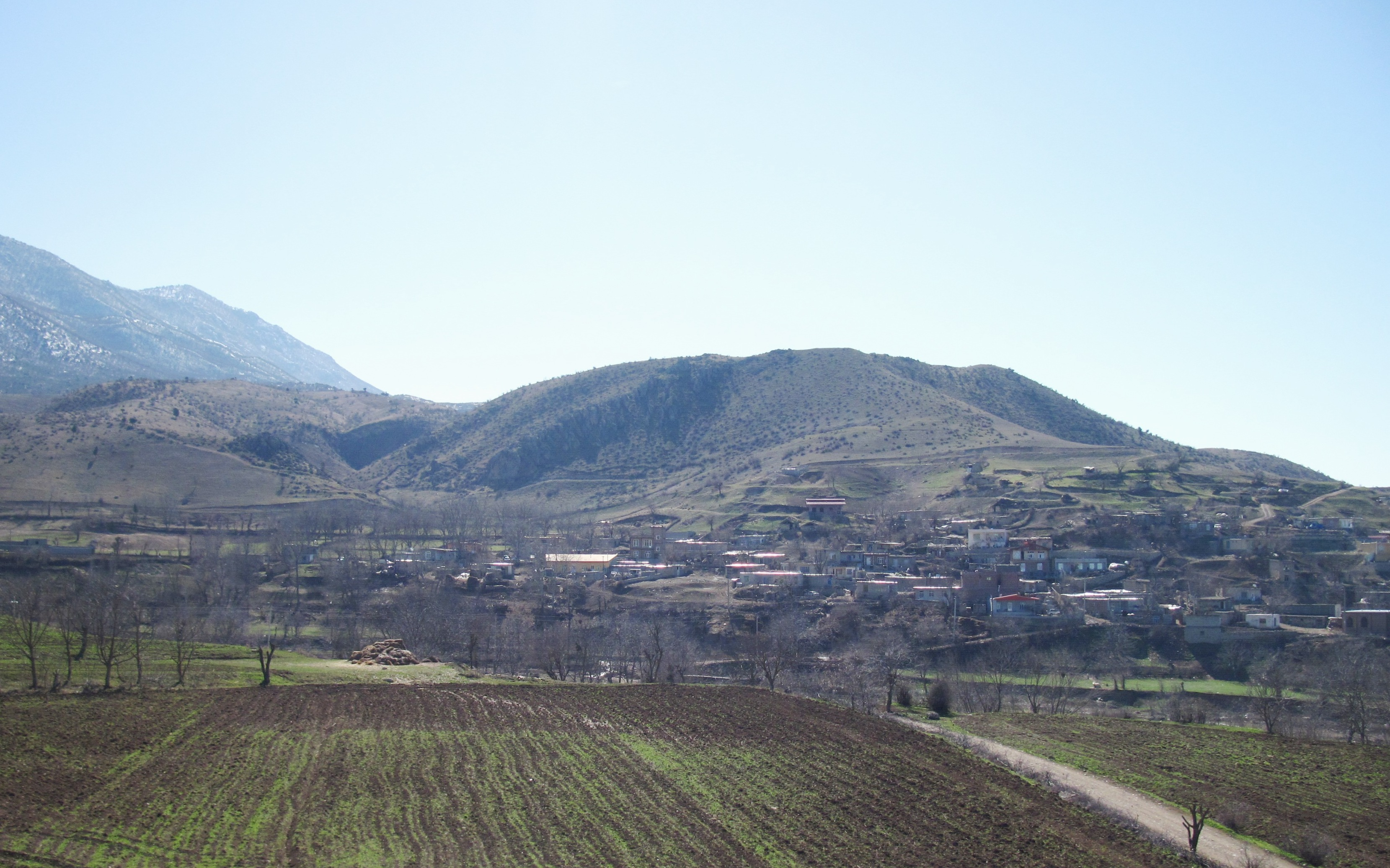
- A view of the village in 2012

- Location within Iran
- Coordinates: 39°03′53″N 46°49′51″E
- Country: Iran
- Province: East Azerbaijan
- County: Khoda Afarin
- Bakhsh: Minjavan
- Rural District: Minjavan-e Sharqi
- Elevation: 510 m (1,670 ft)

Population (2006)
  - Total: 265
- Time zone: UTC+3:30 (IRST)
  - Summer (DST): UTC+4:30 (IRDT)

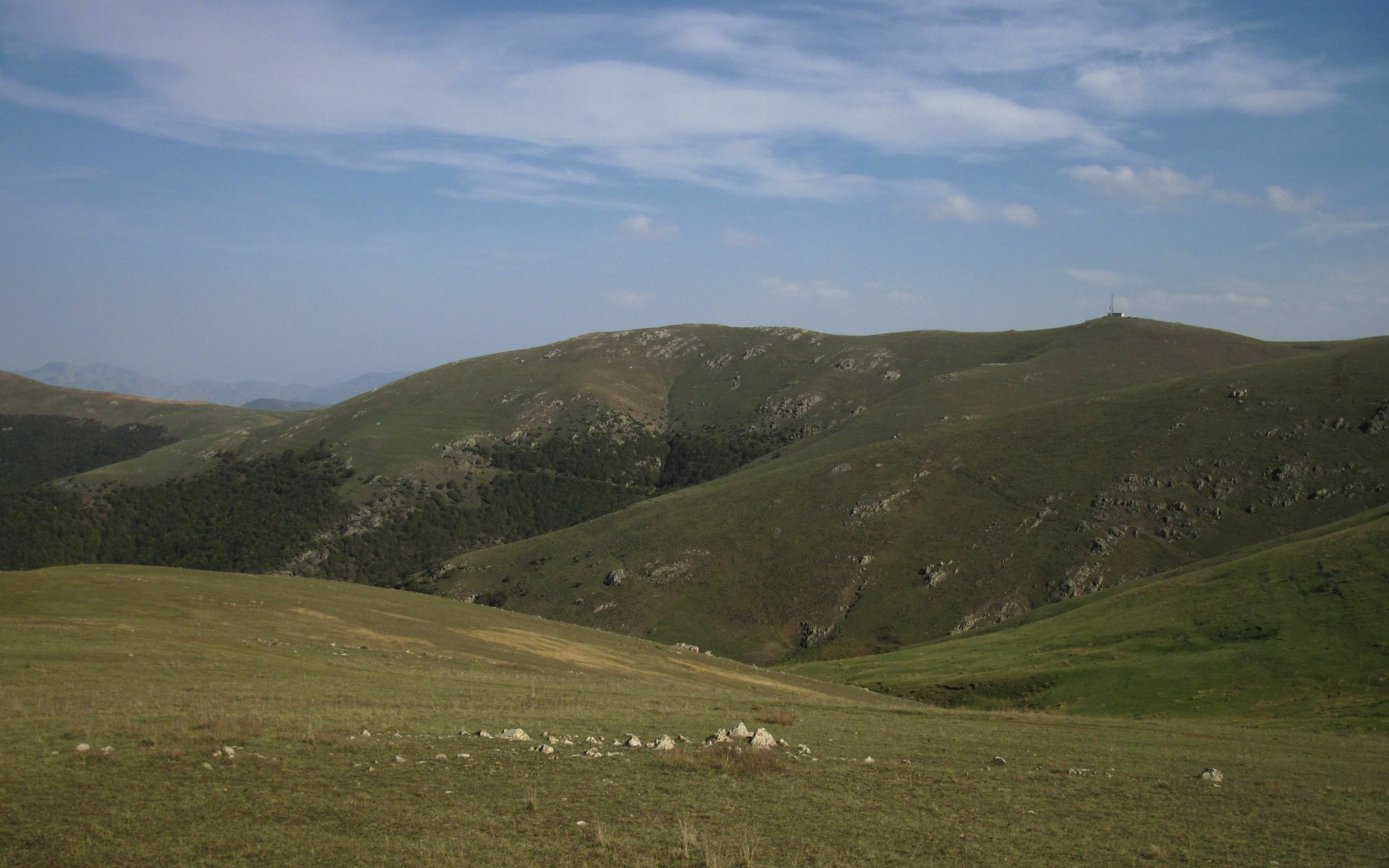
The summer quarters of Tu Ali nomads on the mountain ranges around Abbasabad

Tu Ali-ye Olya (Persian: طوعلی عليا, also Romanized as Tū ‘Alī-ye ‘Olyā, Toloo Ali Olya, and Tow 'Ali-ye 'Olyā; also known as, Yokhsha Tūālī, and Yukhari Tuali) is a village in Minjavan-e Sharqi Rural District, Minjavan District, Khoda Afarin County, East Azerbaijan Province, Iran. At the 2006 census, its population was 265, in 66 families.

In the wake of White Revolution (early 1960s) a clan of Mohammad Khanlu tribe, comprising 35 households, used Tu Ali-ye Olya as their winter quarters. These semi-settled nomads spent summer months in pastures located between Chaparli and Aqdash. Their pastors' proximity to meadows in Abbasabad territory was a bone of contention that caused frequent clashes. Finally inhabitants of Abbasabad gave the bordering meadows to the well connected cleric, Mohamad Zakeri, and the territorial infringement ceased thereafter. In recent years most nomads have settled. Tu Ali-ye Olya has a historical citadel named "Gavir" situated in south. The spoken language is Azerbaijani. The village has an elevation of 510 meters above sea level
