= Sorkheh Kamran =

Sorkheh Kamran سرخه كمران
- Village
- Location within Iran
- Coordinates: 38°58′11″N 46°57′55″E
- Country: Iran
- Province: East Azerbaijan
- County: Khoda Afarin
- Bakhsh: Minjavan
- Rural District: Minjavan-e Sharqi

Population (2006)
  - Total: 38
- Time zone: UTC+3:30 (IRST)
  - Summer (DST): UTC+4:30 (IRDT)

Sorkheh Kamran (Persian: سرخه كمران, also Romanized as Sorkheh Kamrān; also known as Sorkheh Karān) is a village in Minjavan-e Sharqi Rural District, Minjavan District, Khoda Afarin County, East Azerbaijan Province, Iran. At the 2006 census, its population was 38, in 8 families. The village is populated by the Kurdish Mohammad Khanlu tribe.
