= Ham Neshin =

Ham Neshin همنشين
- Village
- Location within Iran
- Coordinates: 39°02′07″N 46°56′42″E
- Country: Iran
- Province: East Azerbaijan
- County: Khoda Afarin
- Bakhsh: Minjavan
- Rural District: Minjavan-e Sharqi

Population (2006)
  - Total: 131
- Time zone: UTC+3:30 (IRST)
  - Summer (DST): UTC+4:30 (IRDT)

Ham Neshin (Persian: همنشين, also Romanized as Ham Neshīn and Hamneshīn) is a village in Minjavan-e Sharqi Rural District, Minjavan District, Khoda Afarin County, East Azerbaijan Province, Iran. At the 2006 census, its population was 131, in 30 families.

In the wake of White Revolution (early 1960s) a clan of Mohammad Khanlu tribe, comprising 25 households, used Ham Neshin as their winter quarters.
