= Tu Ali =

Tu Ali or Tow Ali (Persian: طوعلي), also rendered as Toloo Ali or Tuali or Tuli, may refer to:

- Tu Ali-ye Olya
- Tu Ali-ye Sofla
