= Shojailu =

Shojailu شجايلو
- Village
- Location within Iran
- Coordinates: 39°08′02″N 46°52′42″E
- Country: Iran
- Province: East Azerbaijan
- County: Khoda Afarin
- Bakhsh: Minjavan
- Rural District: Minjavan-e Sharqi

Population (2006)
  - Total: 286
- Time zone: UTC+3:30 (IRST)
  - Summer (DST): UTC+4:30 (IRDT)

Shojailu (Persian: شجايلو, also Romanized as Shojā'īlū and Shojā‘ī Lū) is a village in Minjavan-e Sharqi Rural District, Minjavan District, Khoda Afarin County, East Azerbaijan Province, Iran. At the 2006 census, its population was 286, in 79 families.

In the wake of White Revolution (early 1960s) a clan of Mohammad Khanlu tribe, comprising 80 households, used Shojailu as their winter quarters.
