= Mafruz Lu =

Mafruz Lu مفروضلو
- Village
- Location within Iran
- Coordinates: 39°08′06″N 46°51′41″E
- Country: Iran
- Province: East Azerbaijan
- County: Khoda Afarin
- Bakhsh: Minjavan
- Rural District: Minjavan-e Sharqi

Population (2006)
  - Total: 290
- Time zone: UTC+3:30 (IRST)
  - Summer (DST): UTC+4:30 (IRDT)

Mafruz Lu (Persian: مفروضلو, also Romanized as Mafrūẕ Lū and Mafrūẕlū; also known as Khavalu, Khaveh Lū, and Māhbūzlū) is a village in Minjavan-e Sharqi Rural District, Minjavan District, Khoda Afarin County, East Azerbaijan Province, Iran. At the 2006 census, its population was 290, in 76 families.

In the wake of White Revolution (early 1960s) a clan of Mohammad Khanlu tribe, comprising 35 households, used Mafruzlu as their winter quarters.
