= Heydarkanlu =

Heydarkanlu حيدركانلو
- Village
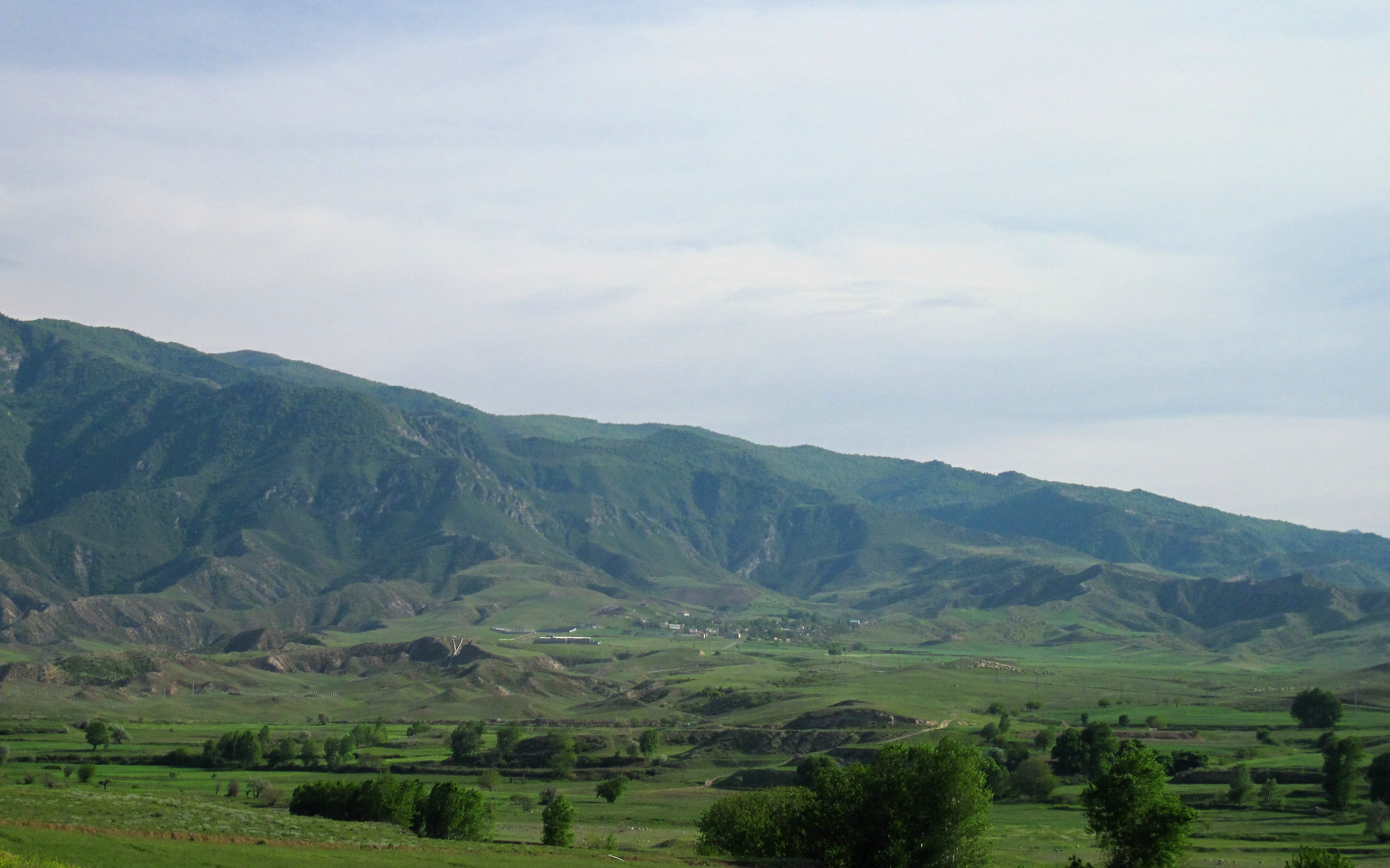
- A view of the village (2013)

- Location within Iran
- Coordinates: 39°04′55″N 46°52′44″E
- Country: Iran
- Province: East Azerbaijan
- County: Khoda Afarin
- Bakhsh: Minjavan
- Rural District: Minjavan-e Sharqi

Population (2006)
  - Total: 335
- Time zone: UTC+3:30 (IRST)
  - Summer (DST): UTC+4:30 (IRDT)

Heydarkanlu (Persian: حيدركانلو, also Romanized as Ḩeydarkanlū; also known as Ḩeydar Kānlū-ye ‘Olyā and Ḩeydarkhanlū) is a village in Minjavan-e Sharqi Rural District, Minjavan District, Khoda Afarin County, East Azerbaijan Province, Iran. At the 2006 census, its population was 335, in 85 families.

In the wake of White Revolution (early 1960s) the ruling clan of Mohammad Khanlu tribe, comprising 60 families, spent their winter in Heydarkanlu.
