= Kurzeh =

Kurazag كورزق
- Village
- Location within Iran
- Coordinates: 39°03′55″N 46°48′33″E
- Country: Iran
- Province: East Azerbaijan
- County: Khoda Afarin
- Bakhsh: Minjavan
- Rural District: Minjavan-e Sharqi

Population (2006)
  - Total: 316
- Time zone: UTC+3:30 (IRST)
  - Summer (DST): UTC+4:30 (IRDT)

Kurazag (Persian: كورزق, also Romanized as Kūrzeh and Koorzeh; also known as Kuraza, Kūrehzeh, Kūreh Z̄eq, Kurze, and Kyuryaza) is a village in Minjavan-e Sharqi Rural District, Minjavan District, Khoda Afarin County, East Azerbaijan Province, Iran. At the 2006 census, its population was 316, in 63 families.

In the wake of White Revolution (early 1960s) a clan of Mohammad Khanlu tribe, comprising 16 households, used Kurzeh as their winter quarters.
