= Shah Yurdi =

Shah Yurdi or Shahyowrdi (Persian: شاه يوردي) may refer to:

- Shah Yurdi, East Azerbaijan
- Shah Yurdi, Isfahan
