= Mashhad Hasanlu =

Mashhad Hasanlu مشدحسنلو
- Village
- Location within Iran
- Coordinates: 38°56′37″N 46°42′41″E
- Country: Iran
- Province: East Azerbaijan
- County: Khoda Afarin
- Bakhsh: Minjavan
- Rural District: Minjavan-e Gharbi

Population (2006)
  - Total: 230
- Time zone: UTC+3:30 (IRST)
  - Summer (DST): UTC+4:30 (IRDT)

Mashhad Hasanlu (Persian: مشدحسنلو, also Romanized as Mashhad Ḩasanlū; also known as Mashhadī ‘Asalū, Mashhadī Ḩasanlū, Mashhadī Hasnloo Meikhan, Mashhadī Ḩoseynaklū, Meshady Asalu, and Meshedi Asalu) is a village in Minjavan-e Gharbi Rural District, Minjavan District, Khoda Afarin County, East Azerbaijan Province, Iran. At the 2006 census, its population was 230, in 47 families.

In the wake of White Revolution (early 1960s) a clan of Mohammad Khanlu tribe, comprising 25 households, used Mashhad Hasanlu as their winter quarters.
