= Dari Lu =

Village in East Azerbaijan province, Iran

Dari Lu Persian: دريلو
- Village
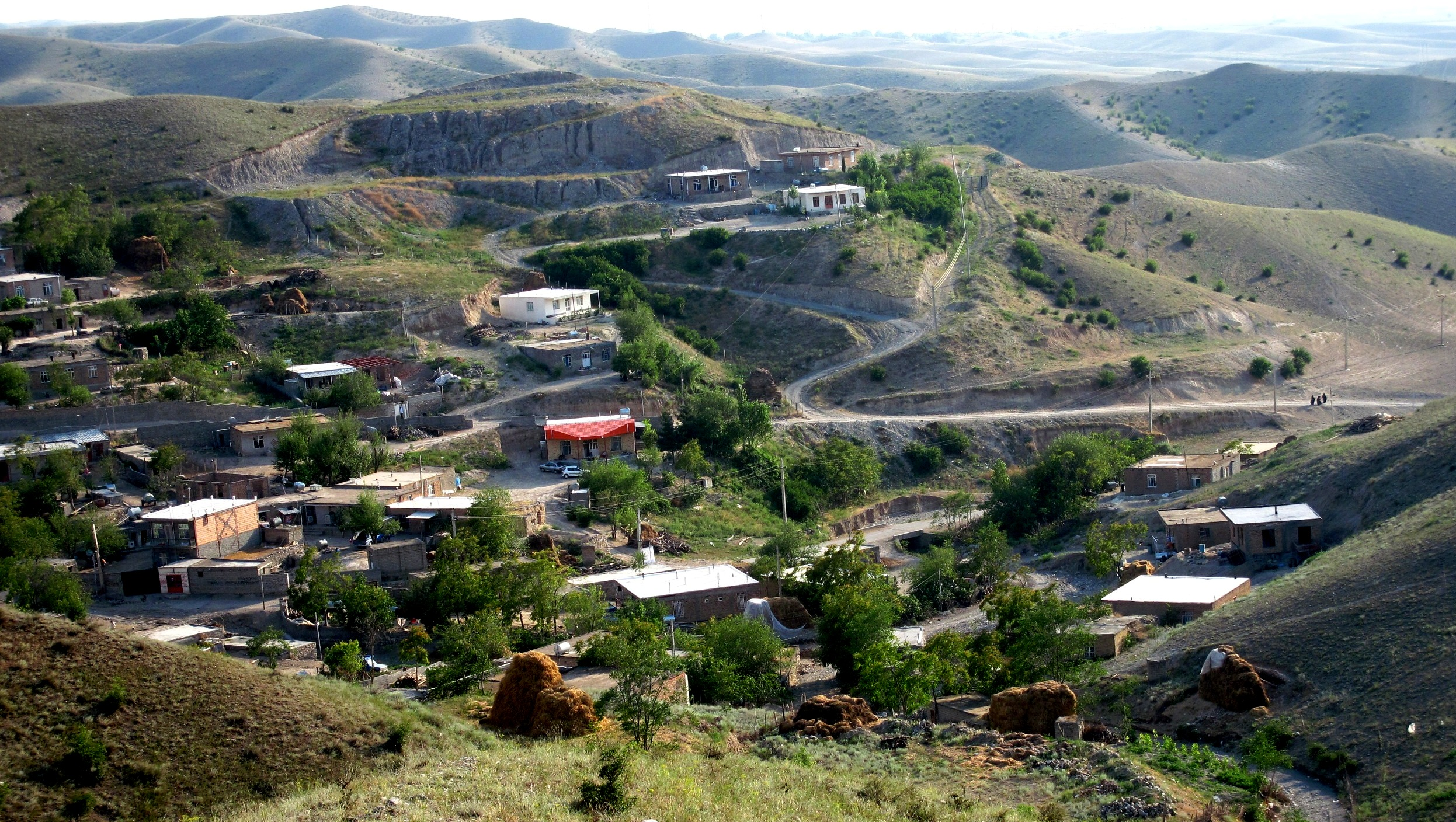
- The village of Dari Lu during the construction boom of 2011

- Location within Iran
- Coordinates: 39°06′00″N 46°51′24″E
- Country: Iran
- Province: East Azerbaijan
- County: Khoda Afarin
- District: Manjavan
- Rural District: Manjavan-e Sharqi

Population (2016)
  - Total: 407
- Time zone: UTC+3:30 (IRST)

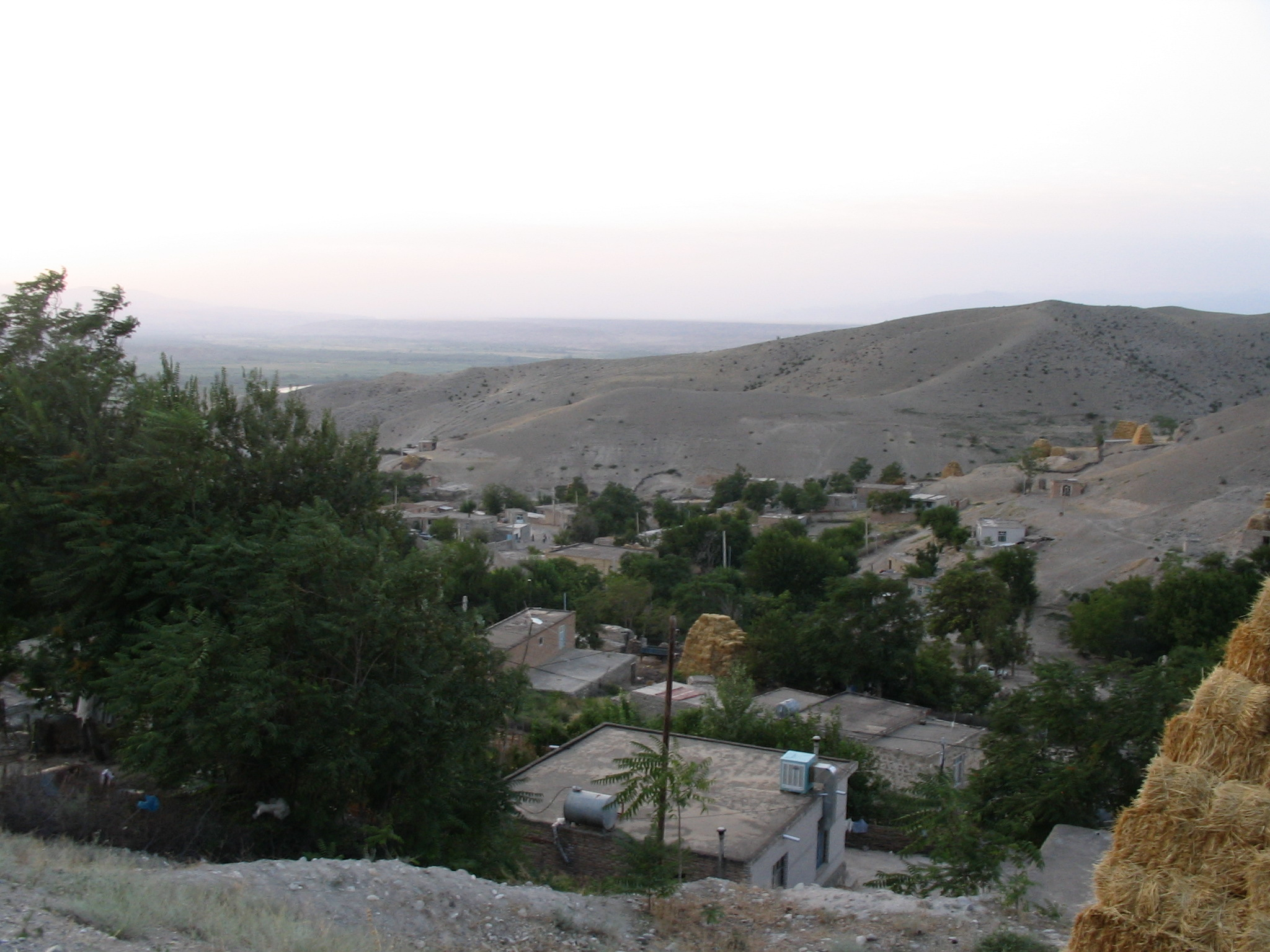
The village before reconstruction (August 2006)

Dari Lu (Persian: دریلو) (Note: Also known as Dirili) is a village in Manjavan-e Sharqi Rural District of Manjavan District in Khoda Afarin County, East Azerbaijan province, Iran.

== Demographics ==
=== Population ===
At the time of the 2006 National Census, the village's population was 429 in 84 households, when it was in the former Khoda Afarin District of Kaleybar County. The following census in 2011 counted 399 people in 102 households, by which time the district had been separated from the county in the establishment of Khoda Afarin County. The rural district was transferred to the new Manjavan District. The 2016 census measured the population of the village as 407 people in 140 households.

In the wake of White Revolution (early 1960s) a clan of Mohammad Khanlu tribe, comprising 40 households, used Derilou as their winter quarters.

At present, most inhabitants are farmers. Still, during hot days of late spring and summer they move to tents in Chaparli summer camp to provide relatively large sheep herds of the village with better grazing opportunity.

Before the 1940s the village enjoyed relative fame as the seat of Hossein Khan Leysi, who was a feudal from the ruling family of the Mohammad Khanlu tribe. After the Khan's second marriage to a commoner girl from upland region, he moved to Abbasabad, and Derilou lost its former importance. Still the Khan's sons married and the family was expanded. At present half of the village's inhabitants are descendants of Hossein Khan.
