= Dash Bashi =

Dash Bashi داش باشي
- Village
- Location within Iran
- Coordinates: 38°59′05″N 46°53′23″E
- Country: Iran
- Province: East Azerbaijan
- County: Khoda Afarin
- Bakhsh: Minjavan
- Rural District: Minjavan-e Sharqi

Population (2006)
  - Total: 41
- Time zone: UTC+3:30 (IRST)
  - Summer (DST): UTC+4:30 (IRDT)

Dash Bashi (Persian: داش باشي, also Romanized as Dāsh Bāshī and Dāshbāshī; also known as Dāsh Bāsh, Dashbash, and Sar Sang; in Armenian: Քարագլուխ) is a village in Minjavan-e Sharqi Rural District, Minjavan District, Khoda Afarin County, East Azerbaijan Province, Iran. At the 2006 census, its population was 41, in 10 families. The village is populated by the Kurdish Chalabianlu tribe.
