= Masjedlu, East Azerbaijan =

Masjedlu مسجدلو
- Village
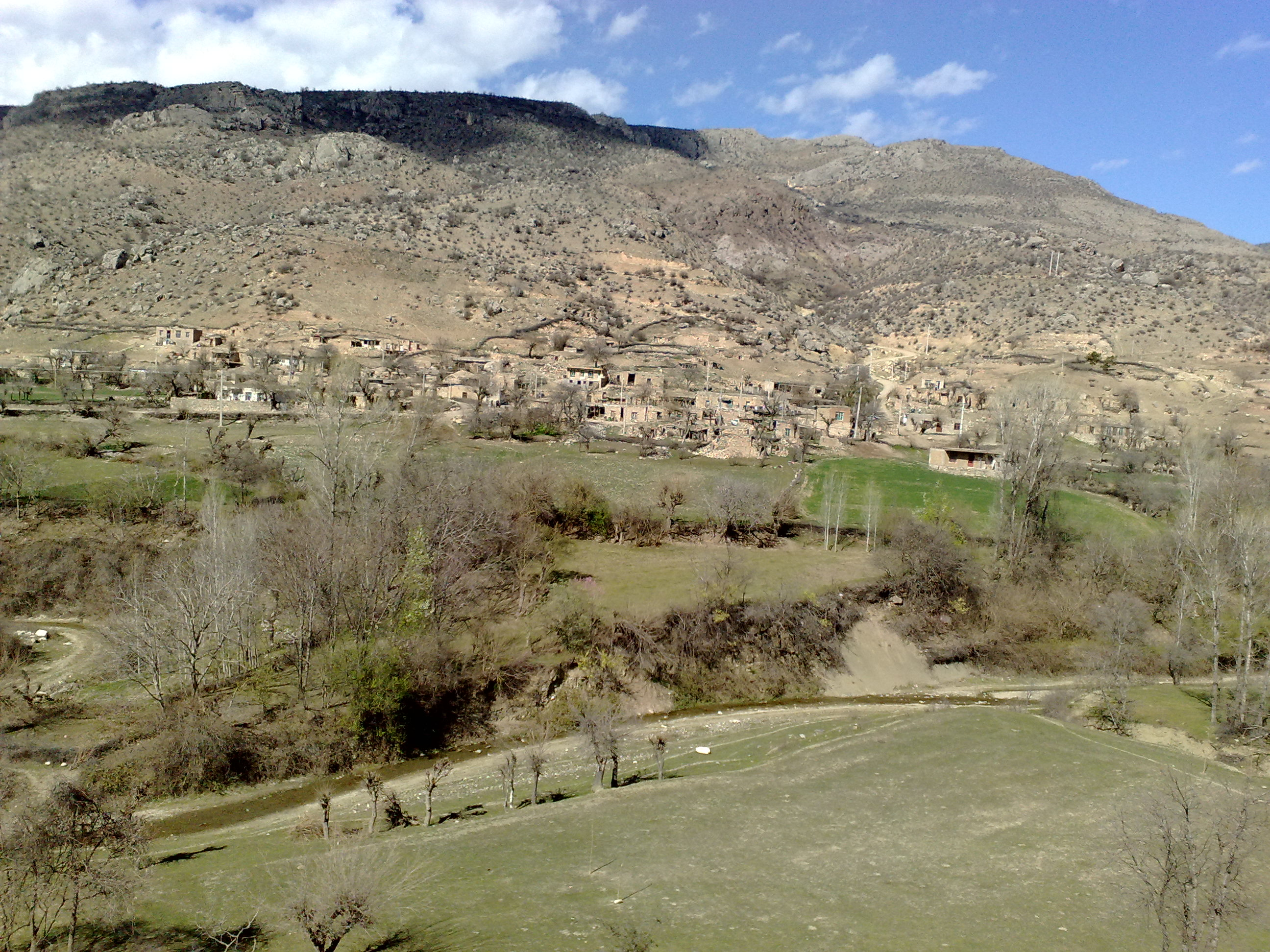
- Masjedlu in March 2009

- Location within Iran
- Coordinates: 38°56′34″N 46°45′19″E
- Country: Iran
- Province: East Azerbaijan
- County: Khoda Afarin
- Bakhsh: Minjavan
- Rural District: Minjavan-e Gharbi

Population (2006)
  - Total: 45
- Time zone: UTC+3:30 (IRST)
  - Summer (DST): UTC+4:30 (IRDT)

Masjedlu (Persian: مسجدلو, also Romanized as Masjedlū; also known as Masjedī, Masjidi, and Mechety; in Armenian: Մէզկիթ) is a village in Minjavan-e Gharbi Rural District, Minjavan District, Khoda Afarin County, East Azerbaijan Province, Iran. At the 2006 census, its population was 45, in 14 families. The online edition of the Dehkhoda Dictionary, quoting Iranian Army files, reports a population of 639 people in late 1940s. According to a more recent statistics (2012) the population is 45 people in 14 families.

According to P. Oberling, the inhabitants belonged to Mohammad Khanlu tribe. The affiliation, however, could not be ethnic as people of Masjedlu are followers of Yarsan religion. Until 1990, Habib Soltani was one of the elites of Yarsan religion in Arasbaran region. His younger son, Asghar Soltani, was a prominent poet.
