= Gavahan =

Gavahan گاواهن
- Village
- Location within Iran
- Coordinates: 39°02′19″N 47°00′46″E
- Country: Iran
- Province: East Azerbaijan
- County: Khoda Afarin
- Bakhsh: Central
- Rural District: Keyvan

Population (2006)
  - Total: 82
- Time zone: UTC+3:30 (IRST)
  - Summer (DST): UTC+4:30 (IRDT)

Gavahan (Persian: گاواهن, also Romanized as Gāvāhan; also known as Kāvāhīn) is a village in Keyvan Rural District, in the Central District of Khoda Afarin County, East Azerbaijan Province, Iran. At the 2006 census, its population was 82, with 19 families.

In the wake of the White Revolution a clan of the Mohammad Khanlu tribe, comprising 50 households, used Gavahan as their winter quarters.
