= Tu Ali-ye Sofla =

Village in East Azerbaijan province, Iran

Tu Ali-ye Sofla Persian: طوعلي سفلي
- Village
- Location within Iran
- Coordinates: 39°05′00″N 46°49′23″E
- Country: Iran
- Province: East Azerbaijan
- County: Khoda Afarin
- District: Manjavan
- Rural District: Manjavan-e Sharqi

Population (2016)
  - Total: 364
- Time zone: UTC+3:30 (IRST)

Tu Ali-ye Sofla (Persian: طوعلي سفلي) (Note: Also romanized as Toloo Ali Soflā, Ţow 'Ali-ye Soflá, and Tū ‘Alī-ye Soflá; also known as Ţow ‘Alī Pā’īn, Tuali, Tuālī Ashaghī, and Tūlī ‘Ashāqī) is a village in Manjavan-e Sharqi Rural District of Manjavan District in Khoda Afarin County, East Azerbaijan province, Iran.

== Demographics ==
=== Population ===
At the time of the 2006 National Census, the village's population was 354 in 76 households, when it was in the former Khoda Afarin District of Kaleybar County. The following census in 2011 counted 337 people in 86 households, by which time the district had been separated from the county in the establishment of Khoda Afarin County. The rural district was transferred to the new Manjavan District. The 2016 census measured the population of the village as 364 people in 123 households.

In the wake of White Revolution (early 1960s) a clan of Mohammad Khanlu tribe, comprising 50 households, used Tu Ali-ye Sofla as their winter quarters.
