= Bayduq =

Bayduq بايدوق
- Village
- Location within Iran
- Coordinates: 39°08′23″N 47°04′32″E
- Country: Iran
- Province: East Azerbaijan
- County: Khoda Afarin
- Bakhsh: Central
- Rural District: Keyvan

Population (2006)
  - Total: 102
- Time zone: UTC+3:30 (IRST)
  - Summer (DST): UTC+4:30 (IRDT)

Bayduq (Persian: بايدوق, also Romanized as Bāydūq; also known as Bābdū and Bāydīq) is a village in Keyvan Rural District, in the Central District of Khoda Afarin County, East Azerbaijan Province, Iran. At the 2006 census, its population was 102, in 26 families.

In the wake of White Revolution (early 1960s) a clan of Mohammad Khanlu tribe, comprising 30 households, used Bayduq as their winter quarters.
