= Garmanab =

Village in East Azerbaijan province, Iran

Garmanab Persian: گرمناب
- Village
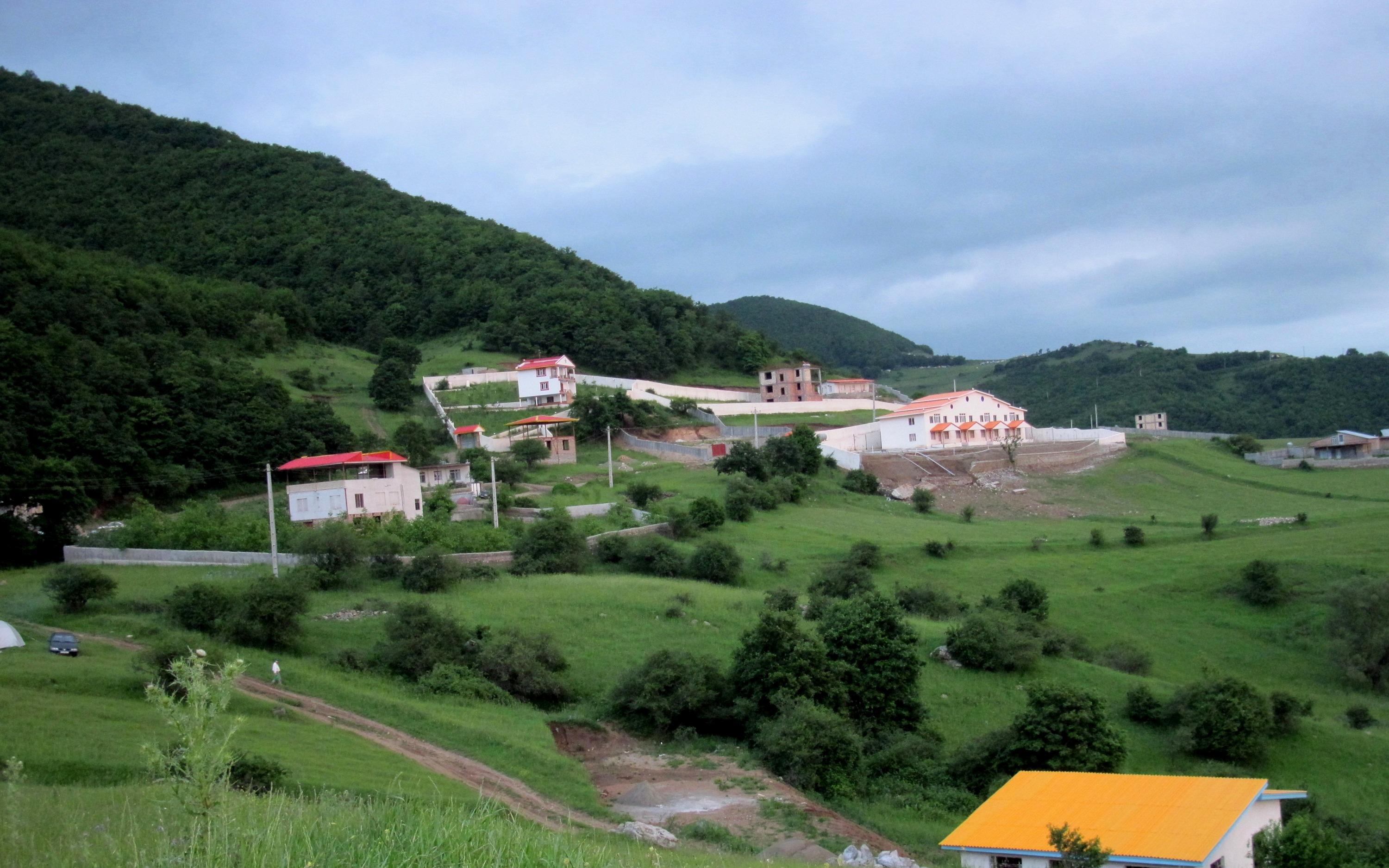
- The village of Garmanab is being reconstructed

- Location within Iran
- Coordinates: 38°55′39″N 46°48′08″E
- Country: Iran
- Province: East Azerbaijan
- County: Khoda Afarin
- District: Manjavan
- Rural District: Manjavan-e Gharbi

Population (2016)
  - Total: 79
- Time zone: UTC+3:30 (IRST)

Garmanab (Persian: گرمناب) (Note: Armenian: Գերմանաւ) is a village in Manjavan-e Gharbi Rural District of Manjavan District, Khoda Afarin County, East Azerbaijan province, Iran.

== History ==
In the late nineteenth and early twentieth century, the village was inhabited by Armenians, who later emigrated to Armenia or Tabriz. Just before World War II, Reza Qoli Khan, a prominent member of the ruling clan of the Mohammad Khanlu tribe, acquired ownership of the village. Shia Muslims and the followers of the Yarsan religion settled in the village. Reza Qoli Khan perished during the brief reign of the Azerbaijan People's Government, following which some members of the Mohammad Khanlu tribe migrated to Qareh Tikanlu.

By the year 2000 the village was deserted. Since 2005, some expatriates, particularly the grandchildren of Reza Qoli Khan and Hossein Khan, the landlord of Abbasabad, have constructed summer residences in the meadows of the former village.

There is a holy shrine in the skirts of a mountain outside of the village, where people of neighboring villages used to slaughter sacrificial animals.

== Demographics ==
=== Population ===
At the time of the 2006 and 2011 National Censuses, the village did not appear in the roster of villages for its rural district, when it was in the former Khoda Afarin District of Kaleybar County. However, the 2016 census measured the population of the village as 79 people in 22 households, by which time the district had been separated from the county in the establishment of Khoda Afarin County. The rural district was transferred to the new Manjavan District.

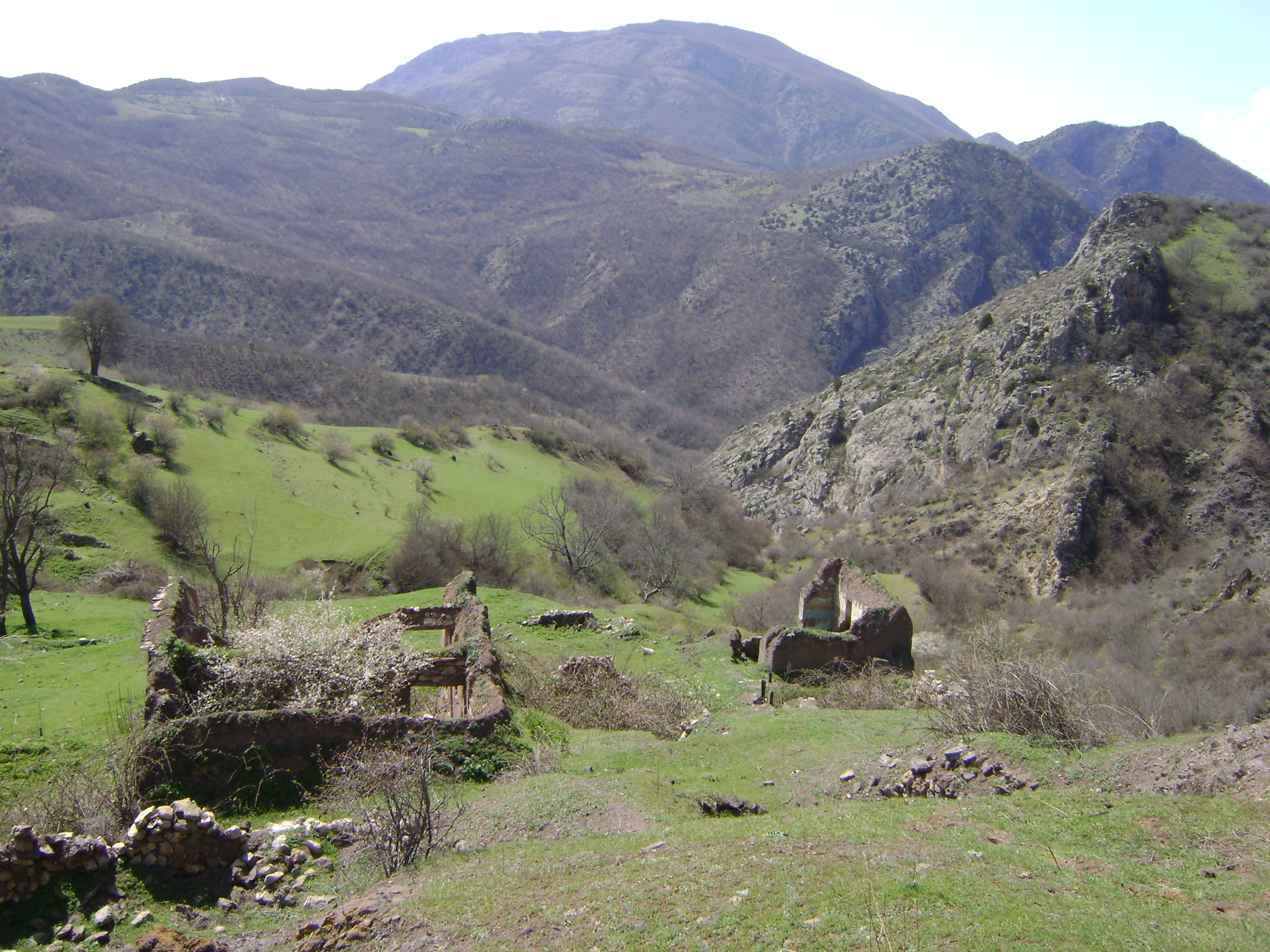
Garmanab was deserted by the end of the twentieth century

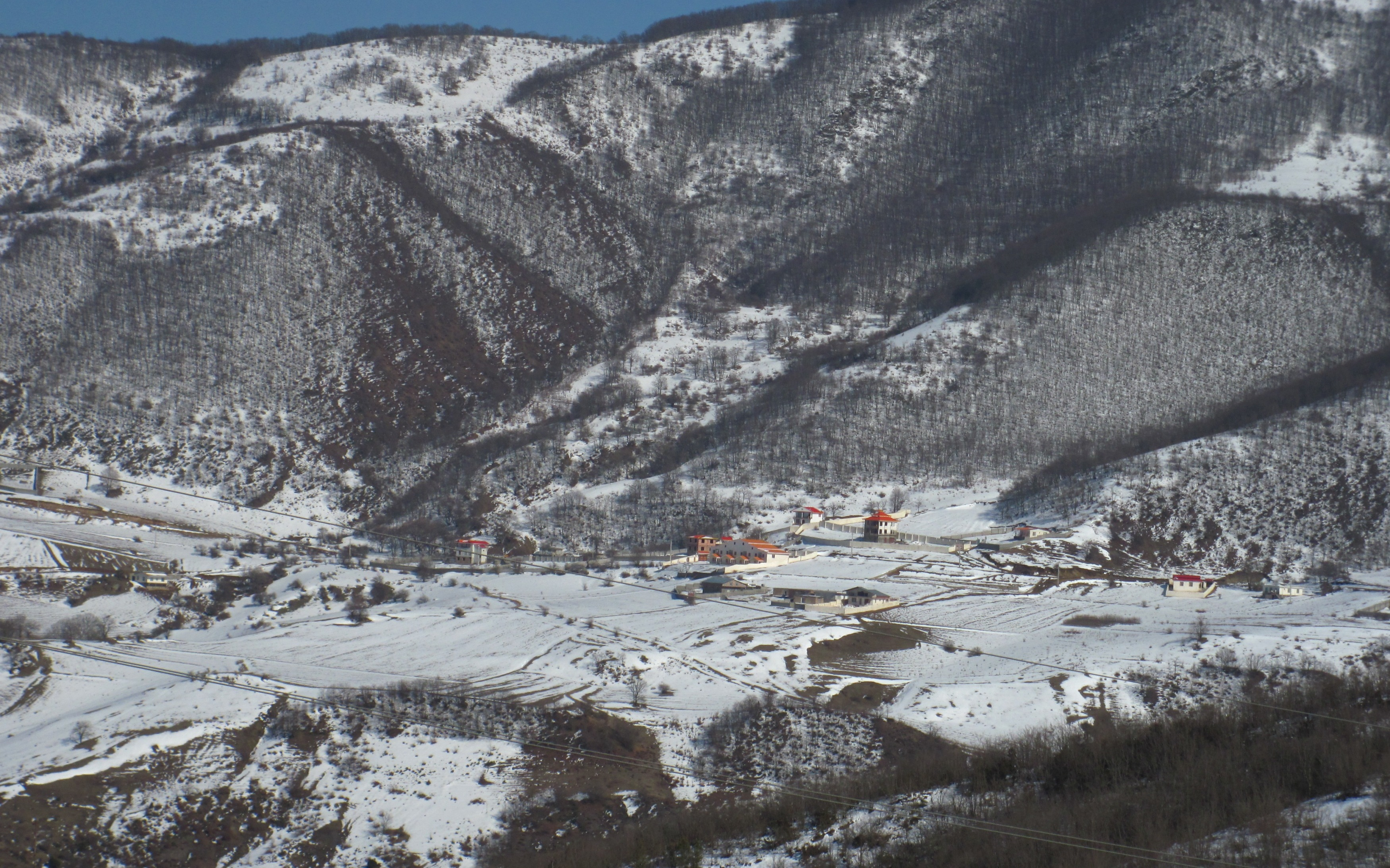
