= Abriq =

Abriq ابريق
- Village
- Location within Iran
- Coordinates: 38°33′54″N 46°55′27″E
- Country: Iran
- Province: East Azerbaijan
- County: Ahar
- Bakhsh: Central
- Rural District: Azghan

Population (2006)
  - Total: 334
- Time zone: UTC+3:30 (IRST)
  - Summer (DST): UTC+4:30 (IRDT)

Abriq (Persian: ابريق, also Romanized as Abrīq) is a village in Azghan Rural District, in the Central District of Ahar County, East Azerbaijan Province, Iran. At the 2006 census, its population was 334, in 74 families.

In the wake of White Revolution (early 1960s) a clan of Mohammad Khanlu tribe, comprising 35 households, used Ebriq as their winter quarters.
