= Seqehsay =

Seqehsay سقه ساي
- Village
- Location within Iran
- Coordinates: 39°05′52″N 47°06′03″E
- Country: Iran
- Province: East Azerbaijan
- County: Khoda Afarin
- Bakhsh: Central
- Rural District: Keyvan

Population (2006)
  - Total: 122
- Time zone: UTC+3:30 (IRST)
  - Summer (DST): UTC+4:30 (IRDT)

Seqehsay (Persian: سقه ساي, also Romanized as Seqehsāy; also known as Seqesāy) is a village in Keyvan Rural District, in the Central District of Khoda Afarin County, East Azerbaijan Province, Iran. At the 2006 census, its population was 122, in 26 families.

In the wake of White Revolution (early 1960s) a clan of Mohammad Khanlu tribe, comprising 50 households, used Seqehsay as their winter quarters.
