= Lowtejan =

Lowtejan لوتجان
- Village
- Location within Iran
- Coordinates: 39°05′14″N 47°04′08″E
- Country: Iran
- Province: East Azerbaijan
- County: Khoda Afarin
- Bakhsh: Central
- Rural District: Keyvan

Population (2006)
  - Total: 192
- Time zone: UTC+3:30 (IRST)
  - Summer (DST): UTC+4:30 (IRDT)

Lowtejan (Persian: لوتجان, also Romanized as Lowtejān; also known as Lotehjān) is a village in Keyvan Rural District, in the Central District of Khoda Afarin County, East Azerbaijan Province, Iran. At the 2006 census, its population was 192, in 44 families.

In the wake of White Revolution (early 1960s) a clan of Mohammad Khanlu tribe, comprising 50 households, used Lowtejan as their winter quarters.
