= Asheqlu =

Village in East Azerbaijan province, Iran

Asheqlu Persian: عاشقلو
- Village
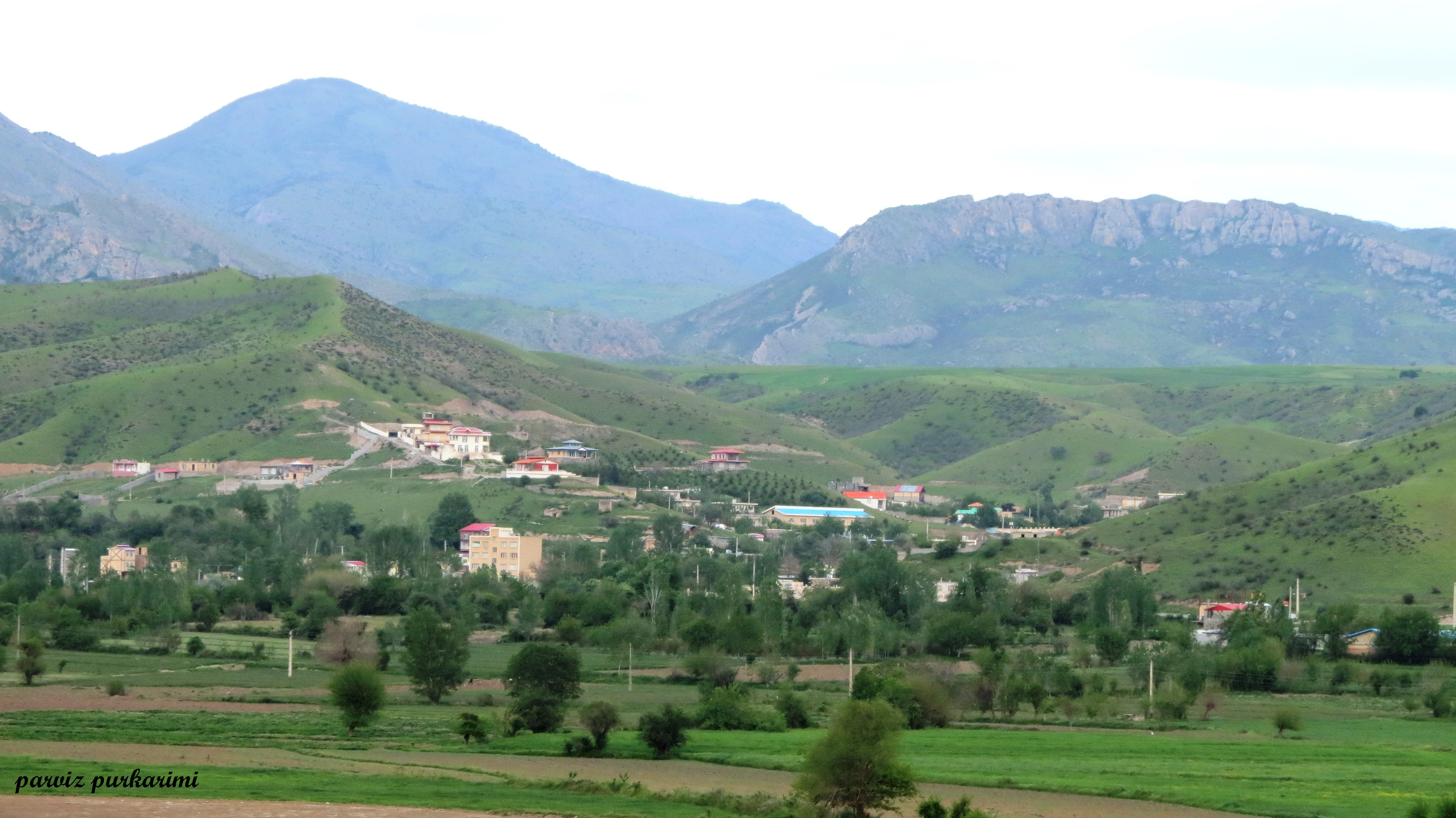
- The village of Asheqlu

- Location within Iran
- Coordinates: 38°59′16″N 46°41′59″E
- Country: Iran
- Province: East Azerbaijan
- County: Khoda Afarin
- District: Manjavan
- Rural District: Manjavan-e Gharbi

Population (2016)
  - Total: 534
- Time zone: UTC+3:30 (IRST)

Asheqlu (Persian: عاشقلو) (Note: Also romanized as ‘Āsheqlū; also known as Ashagly, Ashakhli, Ashāqlī, Asheghloo Meikhan, and Āsheqlī) is a village in Manjavan-e Gharbi Rural District of Manjavan District in Khoda Afarin County, East Azerbaijan province, Iran, serving as capital of both the district and rural district.

== Demographics ==
=== Population ===
At the time of the 2006 National Census, the village's population was 473 in 116 households, when it was in the former Khoda Afarin District of Kaleybar County. The following census in 2011 counted 519 people in 140 households, by which time the district had been separated from the county in the establishment of Khoda Afarin County. The rural district was transferred to the new Manjavan District. The 2016 census measured the population of the village as 534 people in 168 households. It was the most populous village in its rural district.
