= Janan Lu =

Village in East Azerbaijan province, Iran

Janan Lu Persian: جانانلو
- Village
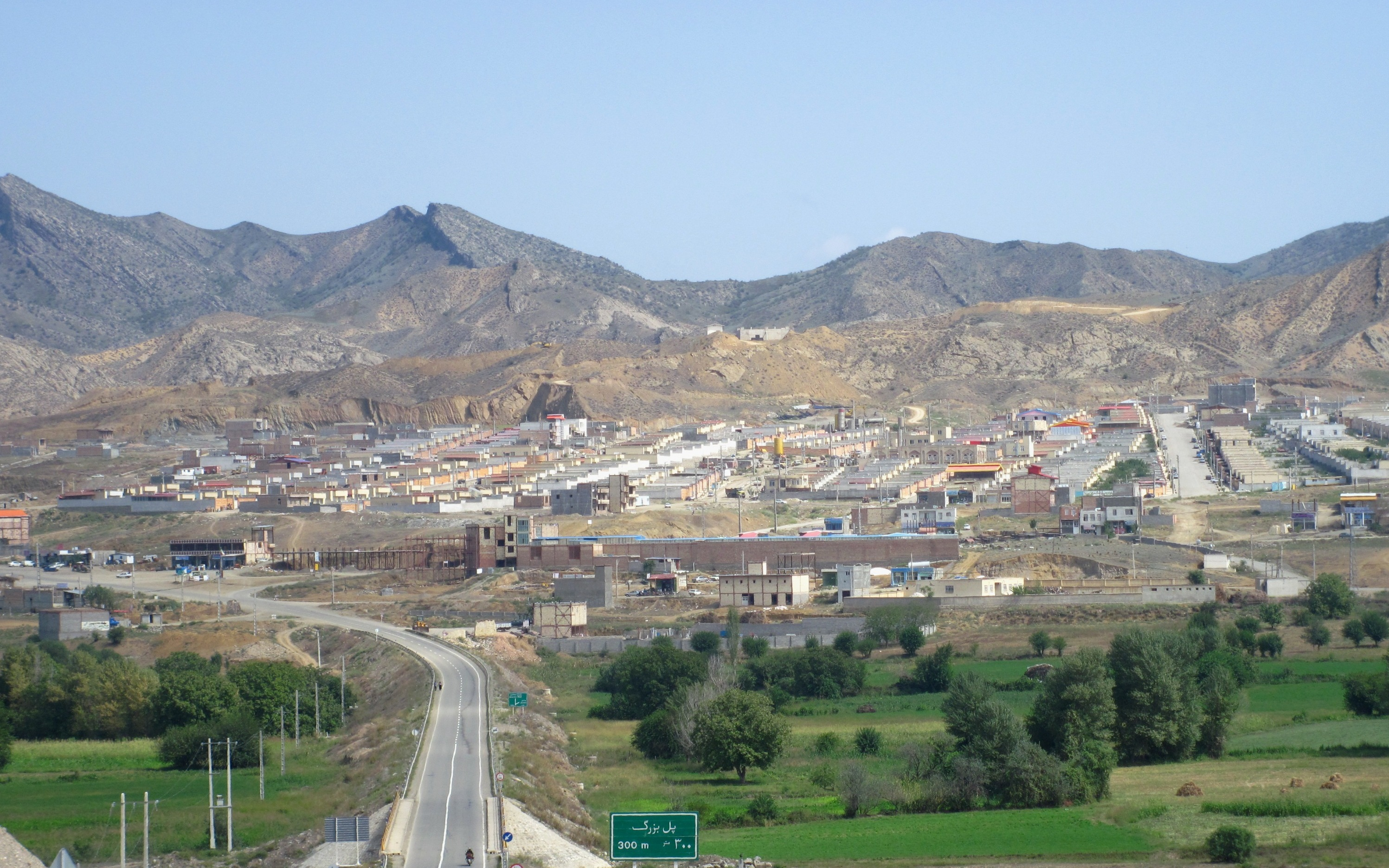
- The village of Janan Lu in October 2011

- Location within Iran
- Coordinates: 39°07′15″N 46°52′54″E
- Country: Iran
- Province: East Azerbaijan
- County: Khoda Afarin
- District: Manjavan
- Rural District: Manjavan-e Sharqi

Population (2016)
  - Total: 1,742
- Time zone: UTC+3:30 (IRST)

Janan Lu (Persian: جانانلو) (Note: Also romanized as Jānān Lū and Jānānlū) is a village in, and the capital of, Manjavan-e Sharqi Rural District in Manjavan District of Khoda Afarin County, East Azerbaijan province, Iran.

== History ==
The online edition of the Dehkhoda Dictionary, quoting Iranian Army files, refers to Jananlu as a Malaria-infested location with a population of 284. At the time, Jananlu was the largest village of Minjavan District. Moreover, a clan of the Mohammad Khanlu tribe, comprising 60 households, used the village as its winter quarters.

== Demographics ==
=== Population ===
At the time of the 2006 National Census, the village's population was 604 in 153 households, when it was in the former Khoda Afarin District of Kaleybar County. The following census in 2011 counted 1,786 people in 496 households, by which time the district had been separated from the county in the establishment of Khoda Afarin County. The rural district was transferred to the new Manjavan District. The 2016 census measured the population of the village as 1,742 people in 555 households. It was the most populous village in its rural district. The rate of population growth is perhaps the highest in the Arasbaran region, and it is expected that the village will be designated as a city in near future.

== Archaeology ==
Just to the north of Jananlu in the Khoda Afarin Plain, near the Araxes river, there are located two important archaeological sites of the Chalcolithic period that are near to each other. They are now located on the shore of the artificial lake that has been created after a new dam was built on the river.

=== Kohneh Pasgah ===
Kohne Pasgah Tepesi has a very deep deposit from the Kura–Araxes culture period. It shows a continuity of occupation from the Late Chalcolithic into Early Bronze Age I. Here, the Kura‑Araxes layers superimpose on the Chalcolithic phase without any visible interruption. Kura‑Araxes pottery sherds dating to the earliest phases of this culture are attested. But after the Kura‑Araxes II period (2800‑2600 BC), the site is abandoned until the Iron Age. Nevertheless, the occupation continues at Kohneh Tepesi, a sister site located nearby.

=== Kohneh Tepesi ===
Excavations were conducted at Kohneh Tepesi in 2006 and 2007.

In the middle of the third millennium BC, Kohne Tepesi was a densely occupied site of the Kura–Araxes culture, with the cultural deposits of about six meters thick. Around 2650 BC, there was a shift from the Kura-Araxes II phase to Kura-Araxes III phase.

Then after a gap of thousands of years, the site was reoccupied during the Parthian period.

Outside of the residential area, some unusual funerary structures of Kura-Araxes period were found, which are unknown from elsewhere in Iran.

Tools were made of chert (bifacial sickle elements), and obsidian. The obsidian assemblage is quite unusual, as it lacks standardization and regular tool types.

The faunal remains from the settlement indicate the presence of sheep, goat, and cattle in their economy, with cattle being the main source of food.

== See also ==
- Kul Tepe Jolfa
