= Abbasabad, Khoda Afarin =

Abbasabad عباس اباد
- Village
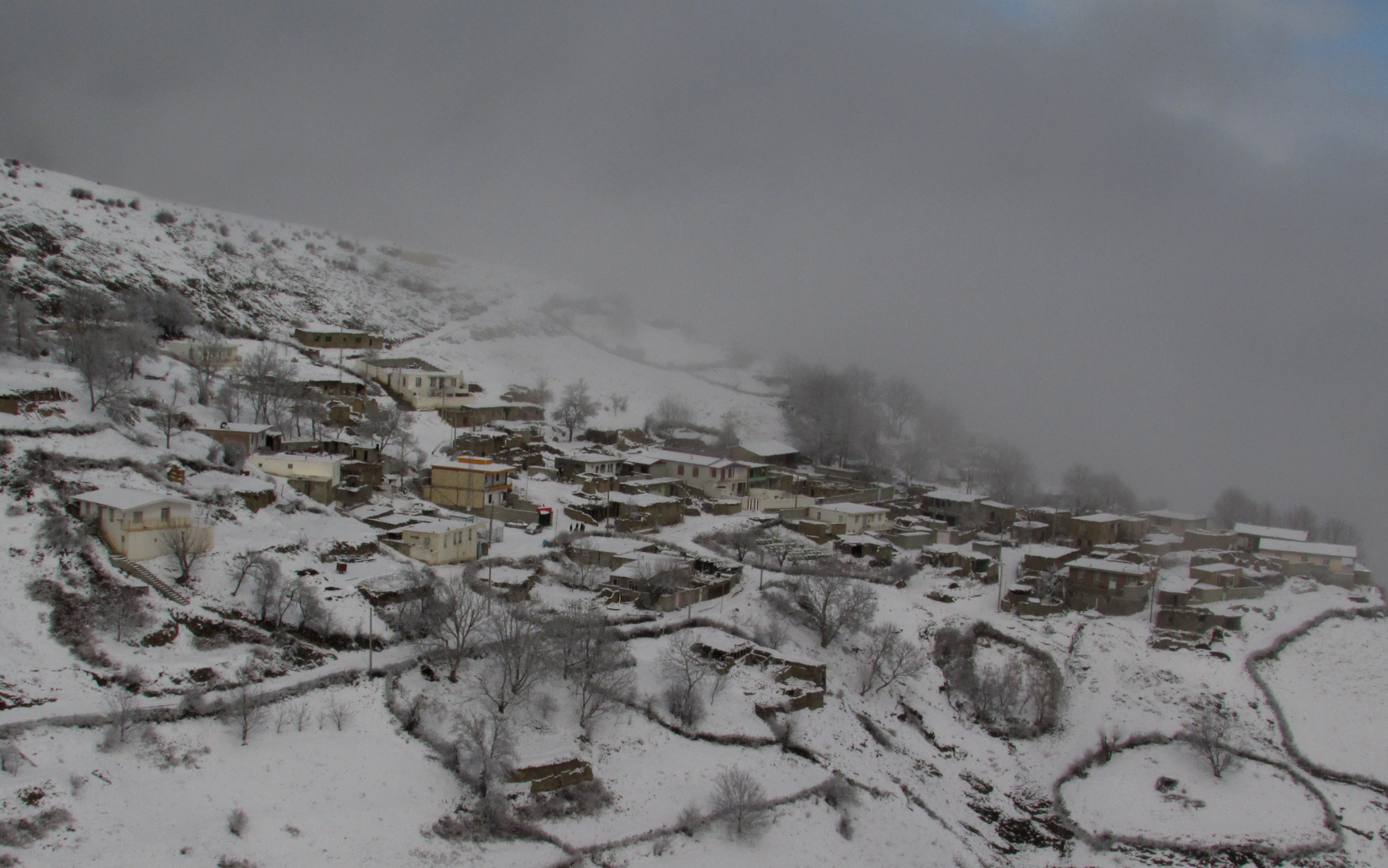
- Village view in February 2014

- Location within Iran
- Coordinates: 38°55′15″N 46°49′30″E
- Country: Iran
- Province: East Azerbaijan
- County: Khoda Afarin
- Bakhsh: Minjavan
- Rural District: Minjavan-e Gharbi
- Elevation: 1,927 m (6,322 ft)

Population (2006)
  - Total: 60
- Time zone: UTC+3:30 (IRST)
  - Summer (DST): UTC+4:30 (IRDT)

Abbasabad (Persian: عباس اباد, also Romanized as Abbāsābād and Abasabad) is a village in Minjavan-e Gharbi Rural District, Minjavan District, Khoda Afarin County, East Azerbaijan province, Iran. At the 2006 census, its population was 60, in 13 families.

== History ==
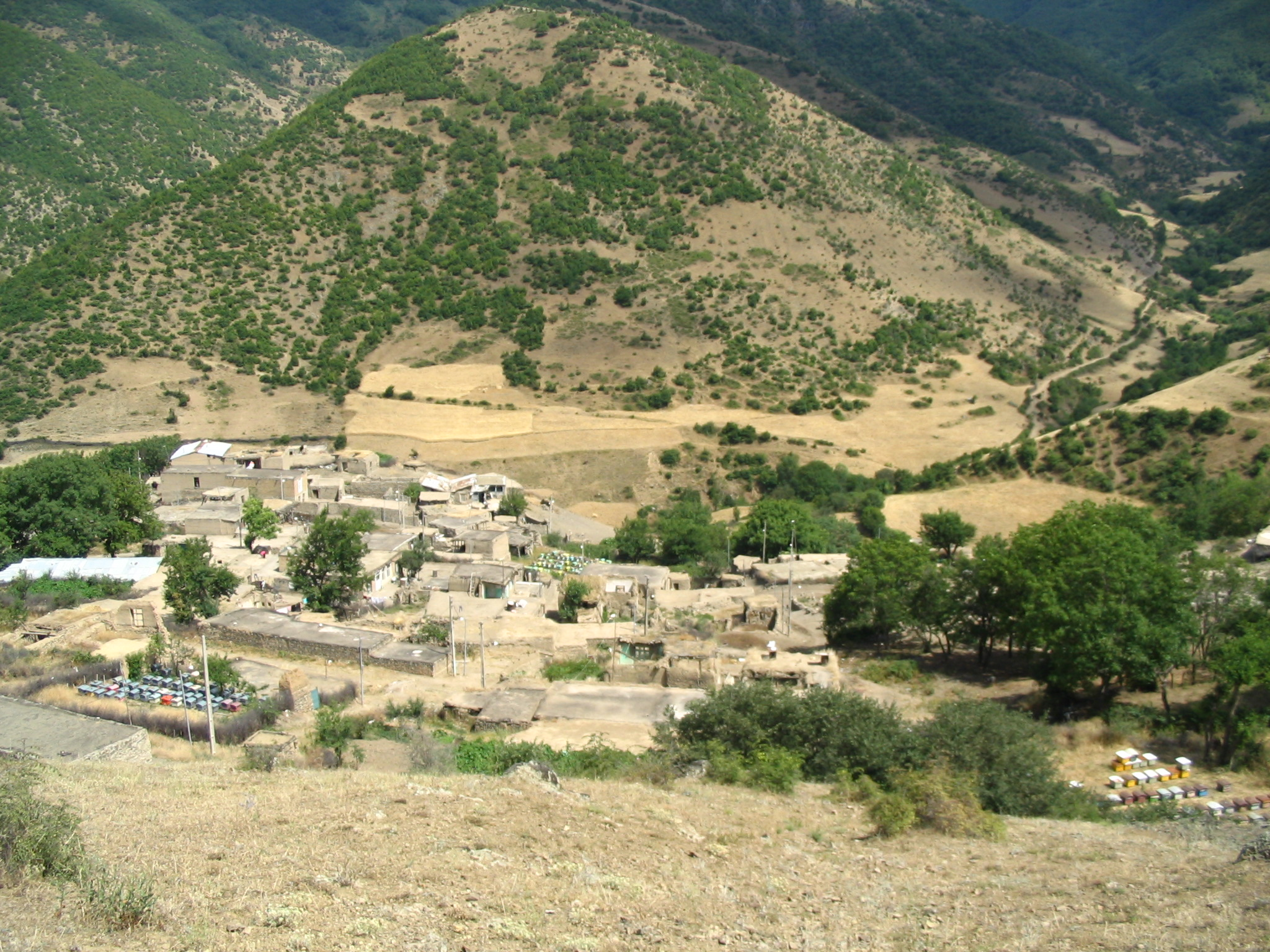
The village's view from a hill at the western side of the village (Summer 2006)

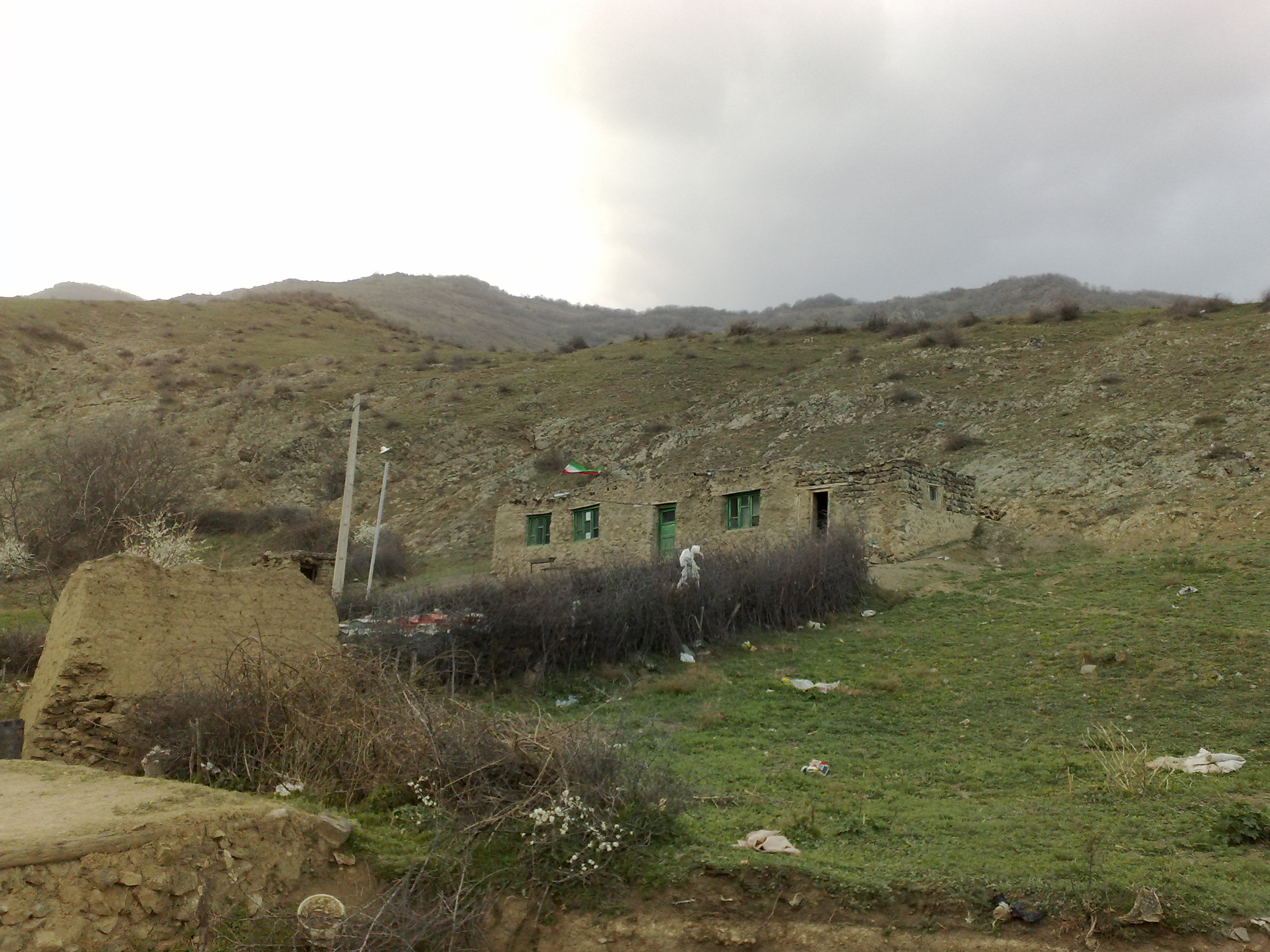
Only 3 children attend the collapsing school.

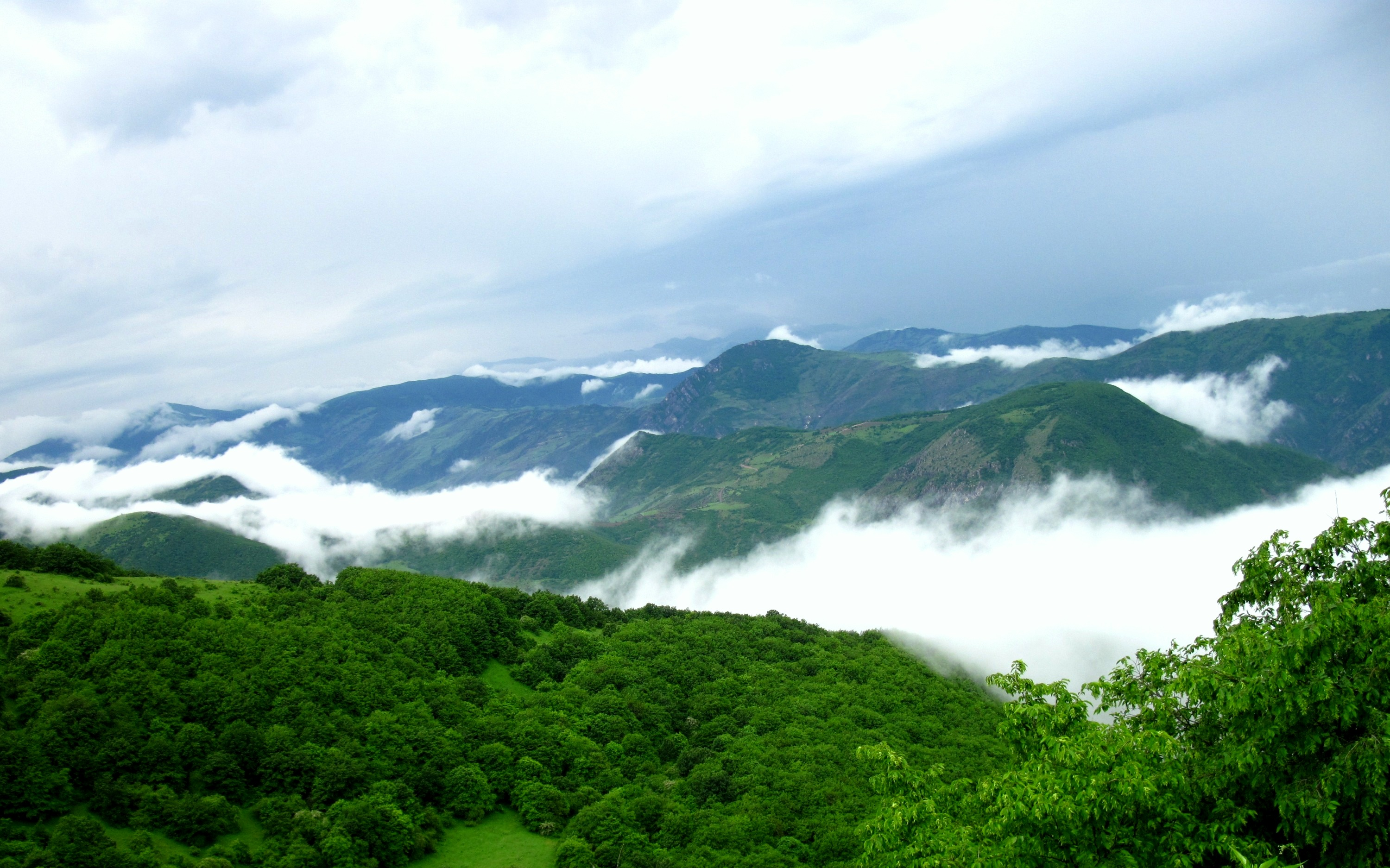
The lush forests and mist-clad mountains have inspired generations of folkloric singers.

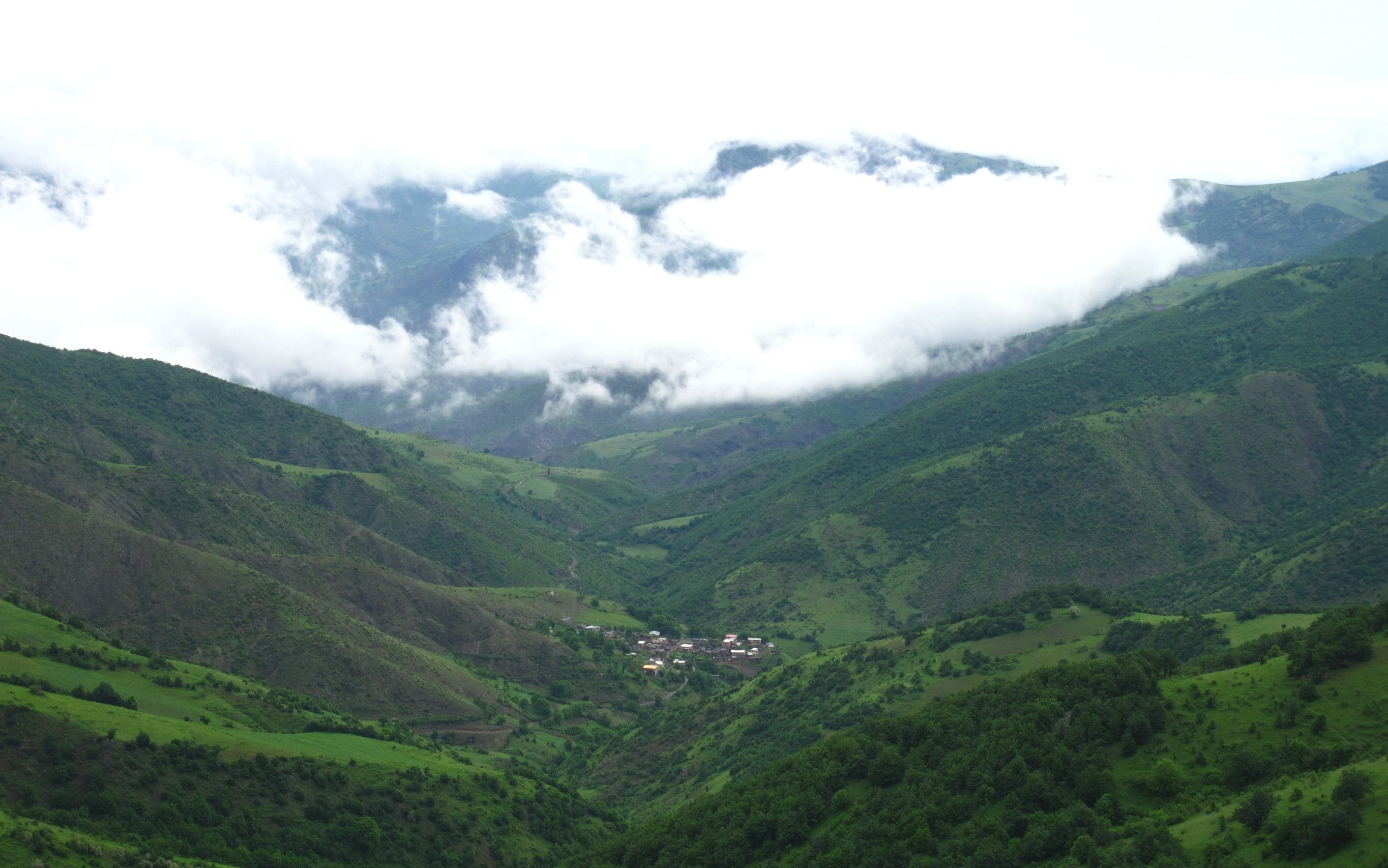
Village view in July 2011

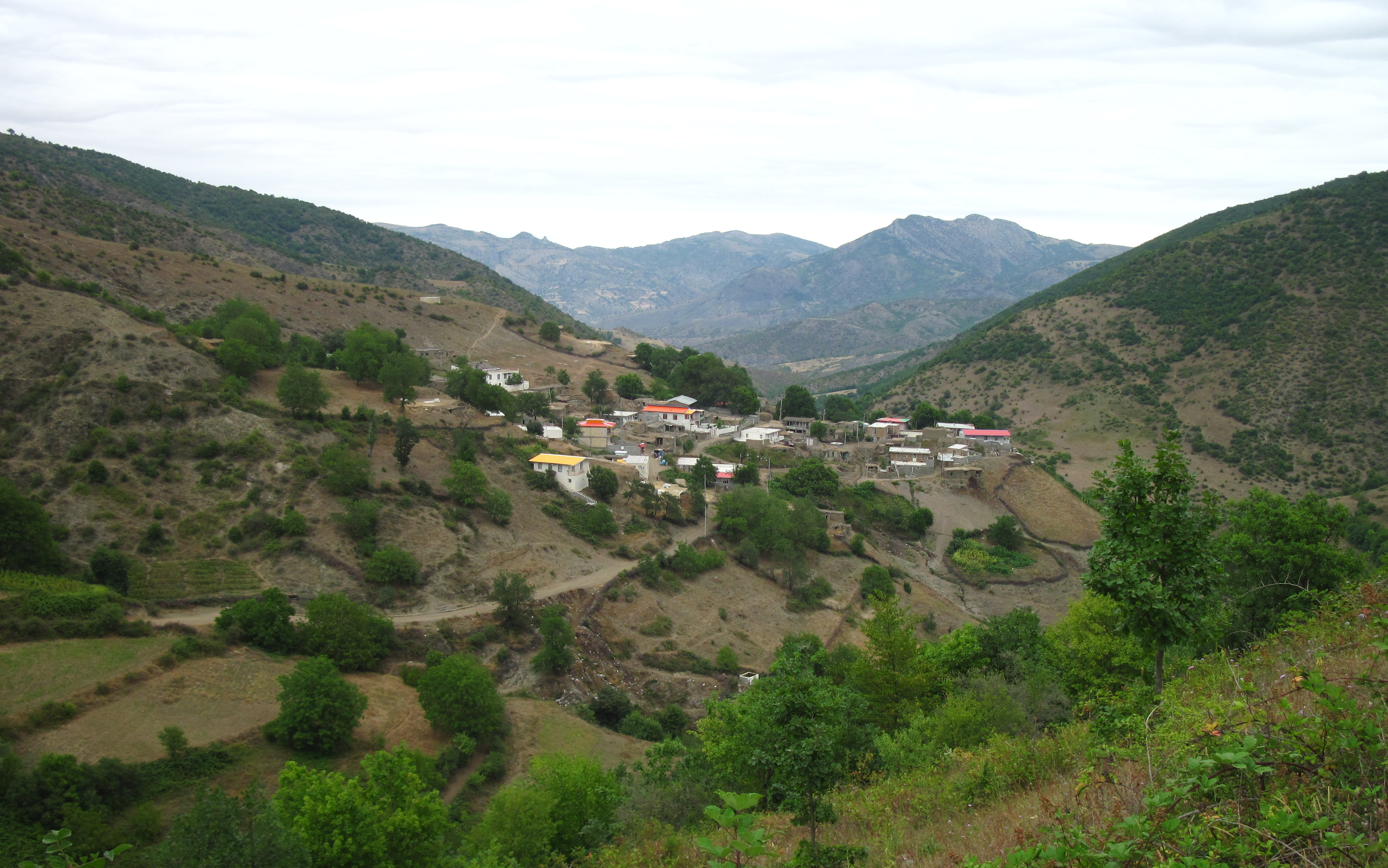
Village view in June 2013

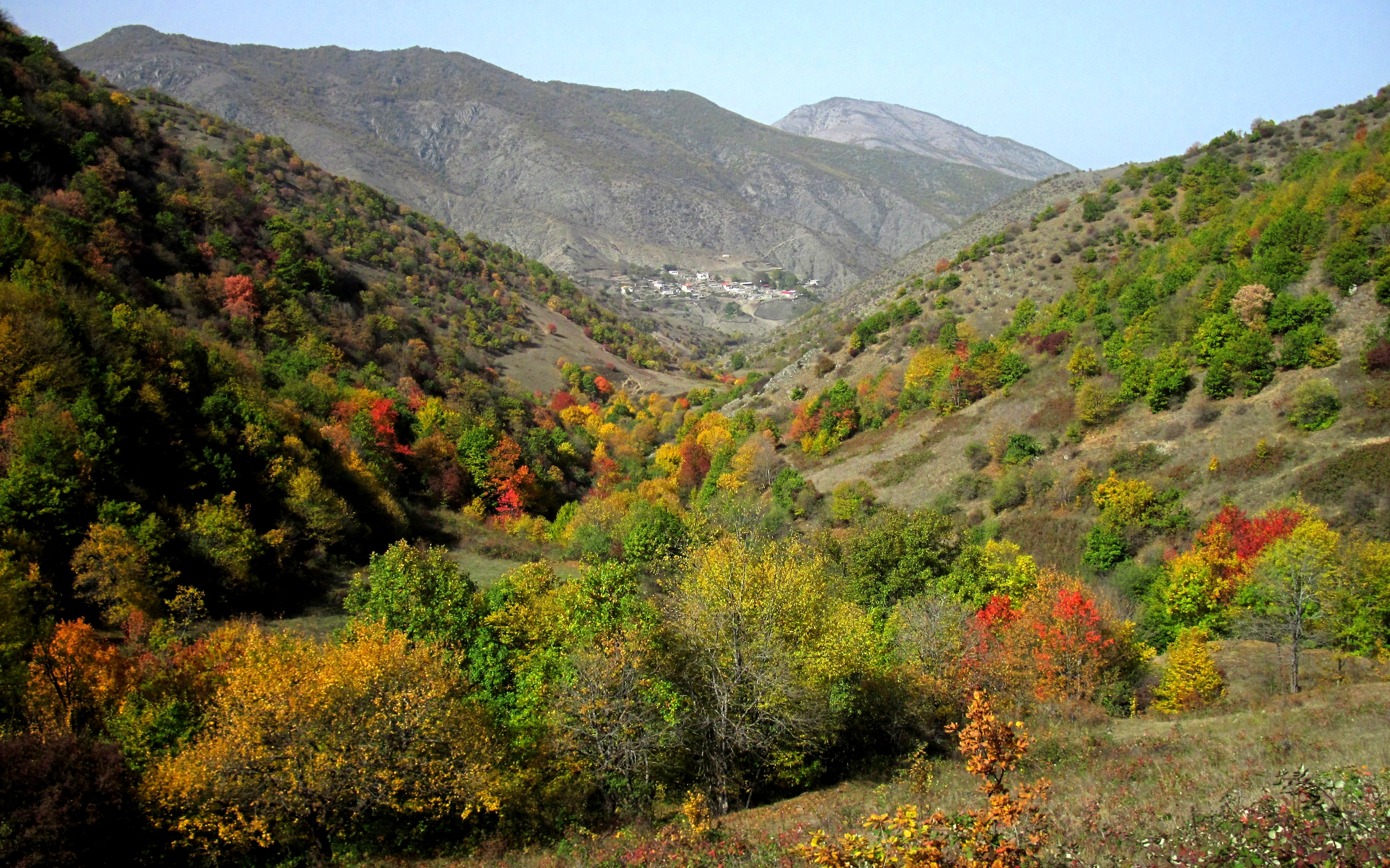
Village view in October 2013

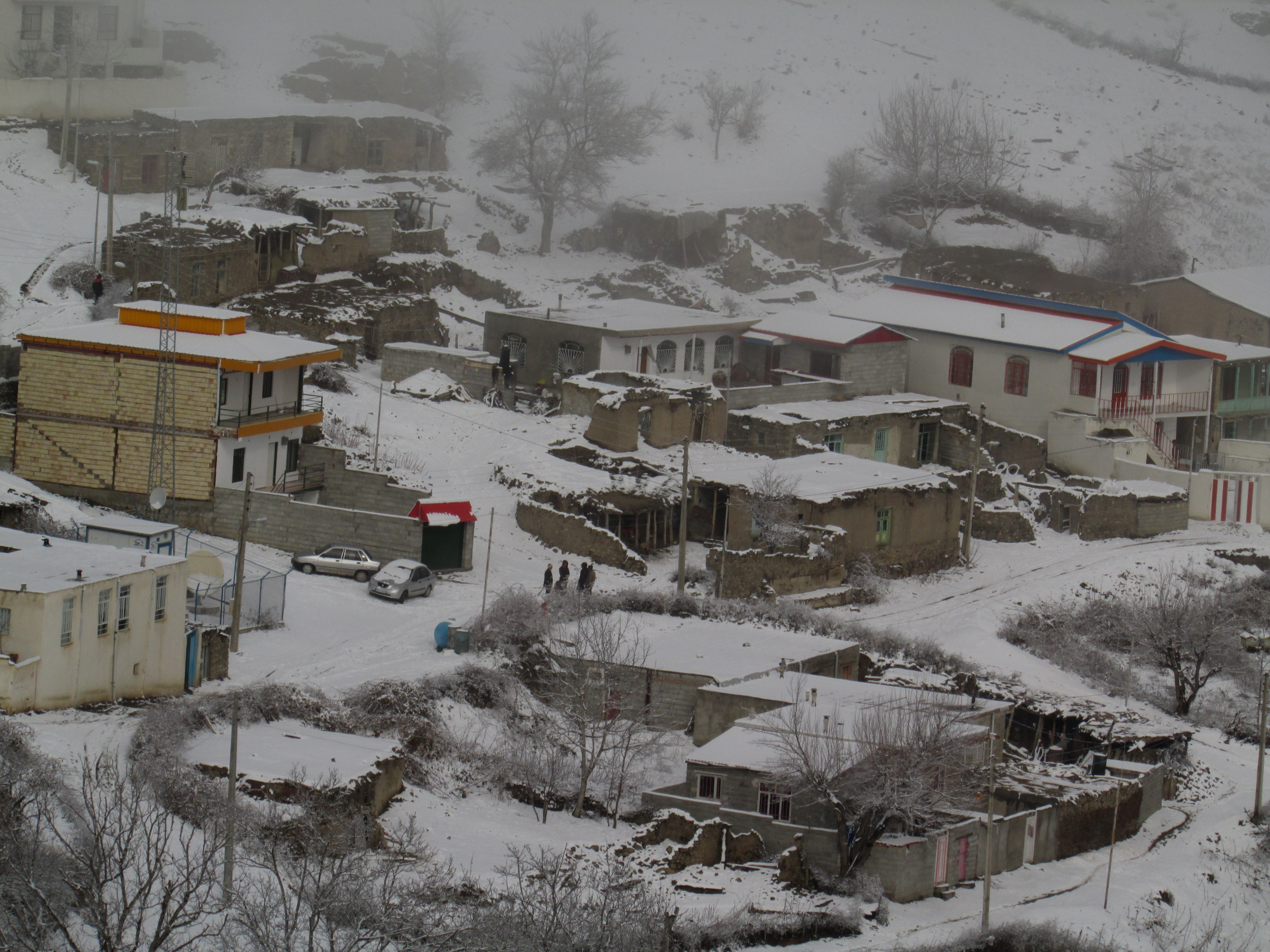
Winter (2014). The construction of modern houses heralds the unexpected resurrection of Arasbaran.

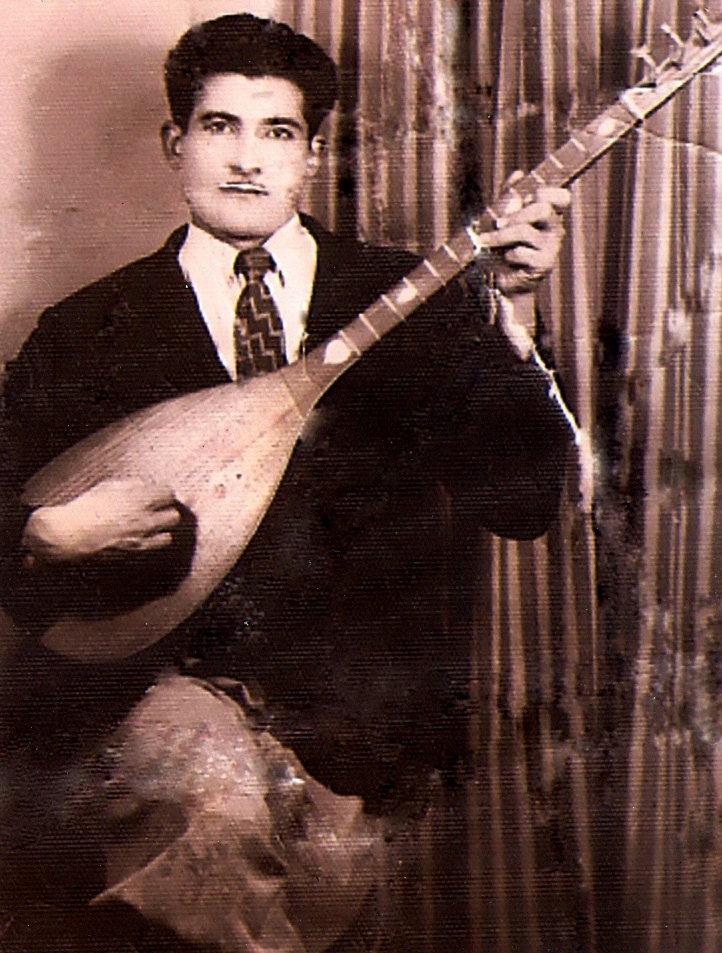
A portrait of Ashik Rasool Qorbani taken in 1955.

According to the village elders, one of whom died in 1991 at an age of over 100 years, the village was founded around 1900. Few years later, the government transferred the village to a prominent Feudal, Haji Safqoli-Xan Leysi (حاجی صفقلی خان لیثی), who built a castle on the hills overlooking the village. An iron-smith and a cleric soon moved in and made the village the official and business center for the county. This status was further strengthened when the second son of the Cleric was endowed with the privilege to act as the notary.

The online edition of the Dehkhoda Dictionary, quoting Iranian Army files, reports a population of 261 people in late 1940s. At that time the pastures on the Chaparli mountain range on the south-east of the village were the summer quarter of the Derilou branch of Mohammad Khanlu tribe, which in the wake of White Revolution included 40 households. The number has dropped over years and in recent years, about 20 families have pitched their tents in the area, albeit mainly to escape the unpleasantly hot climate of Derilou village.

In 1955 a young resident, Ashik Rəsol Qorbani (عاشق رسول قربانی), started his music career and soon became one of the prominent folkloric musicians of Azerbaijan province. Unfortunately, following a quarrel with the cleric he left the village in 1973. Though the two men later reconciled, the feud marked the beginning of the decline in the village's importance.

At the wake of Islamic revolution (1978), the village was populated with twenty five families, down from forty families in 1964 -when the introduction of land reforms accelerated the migration of families to Tabriz. In 2003 the population dropped to just 10 families and it was feared that the village will be deserted in few years, a fate that had befallen upon four neighboring villages, such as Garmanab. The new immigrant families had moved to shanty towns in Tehran suburbs, where they could build cramped dwellings in farmlands by bribing the local authorities.

After the election of Ahmadinezhad as president of Iran, someone circulated a rumor that the UNESCO would compensate the residents shortly to have the village evacuated for the wild-life protection efforts in Arasbaran Protected Area. Some early emigrants returned and built decent houses. At the present the village is undergoing a population boom as more wealthy city residents want to spend their retirement in cleaner environment of secluded mountains. According to a more recent statistics the population is 68 people in 17 families.

== Economy ==
Up until Islamic revolution the village had a subsistence economy – all food was produced within the village and the surplus was bartered with items supplied by travelling salesmen. Rainfed agriculture on the steep slopes had severely eroded the farms and productivity had dropped to unsustainable low level, and the inhabitants had to supplement their income by taking seasonal construction jobs in Tehran. After revolution, thanks to the construction of roads and accessibility of larger town markets, livestock production became the dominant mode of the village economy. However, the quarrels about grazing rights didn't allow Industrial animal agriculture and the efforts of Hüseyn Ismayli, a prominent local businessman, in this regard ended in failure.

== Language ==
The spoken language is Azeri. Life in rough mountainous landscape has resulted in a form of pronunciation that natives of the provenience capital, Tabriz, evaluate to be rough on their ears and attribute it to cultural backwardness due to being raised in mountains. The inhabitants are often the subject of jokes solely based on their peculiar way of pronouncing some words. The alternative pronunciations generally involve a->ə and e->ə transformations in some words—which is identified with Kaleybar region in general.

A distinctive feature of the accent that distinguishes it even from nearby villages is the substitution o -> u, as in "ud" for od (fire); utaq for otaq (room), uldu for oldu (happened); etc.

In grammar, the differences with dominant Azeri accent occurs in verb forms. The following lists the present tense in different persons in comparison to the more standard Azeri version in parentheses. The verb root is "al" meaning "to buy:"

aleyəm (alirəm)

ale(y)sən (alirsən)

aley (alir)

aleyix (aliriq)

ale(y)siz (alirsiz)

aleylər (alirlər).

Note: A strong and audible "y" in second persons is more representative of Kaleybar accent.

Shepherding and cultivation of hillside possess the isolating features for the development of a sophisticated whistled language. The majority of males are able, and perhaps addicted, to masterfully mimic the melodic sounds of musical instruments using fingerless whistle. Melodic whistling, indeed, appears to be a private version of the Ashug music for personal satisfaction. Unfortunately, since more people rely upon communication by cell-phones for outdoor communications, the usage of whistled language is in decline and the language may perish as its master Baxşəli is aging.

== Mythical heritage ==
The inhabitants attribute spiritual importance to at least eight sacred sites, scattered throughout the village territory. None of the sites possess any significantly conspicuous landmark. At three of the sites the locals will occasionally gather to slaughter sacrificial animals. In one site, which will be briefly described in the next paragraph, someone who has a wish fulfilled will offer a simple meal of freshly baked bread and cheese with tea. At the rest, they have collected medium-sized rocks around some trees and hang colour treads or ribbons from the trees. One site has a particularly interesting name, Mosəlla, an Arabic word meaning a place for Friday prayer. Though no one remembers any actual congregation taking place at the site, but when it is observed from the village exactly at the direction of Mecca, a direction Muslims have to face during their daily prayers and other rituals. One may speculate that a learned man has suggested the site for easing the religiously required spatial positioning.

All the mentioned sacred sites are located in an area where the rapid variation on the land topography has generated an easily perceptible boundary. The locals have numerous anecdotes reporting the midnight sighting of djinns, invisible counterparts of humans who according to Islamic traditions, gathering around a bonfire in a celebratory mode.

All sacred sites in some way are linked to Djins via established narratives. However, there are more sites with narrative associations, which are not considered sacred. These sites are in secluded locations formed by natural topography of the landscape. Often, the narratives involve bears as the principal subject. These beasts, in attempt to avoid close encounters with humans, seek seclusion. The main theme of the corresponding narratives is the following. "A male bear kidnaps a blackberry picking pretty girl and takes her to his din at a nearby forest. A hybrid child is born but the girl runs away at the first opportunity leaving the lamenting bear entreatingly crying for his lost wife. Old generation still believe that bears were indeed devolved from a mischievous miller, so there is no difficulty in conceiving their human-like behaviors." The case of wolves is even more relevant in relation in the collective memories of people. Azeris, due to the efforts of Iranian government to eradicate their cultural identity, are ignorant of their historical background, which considers wolf as the mythical ancestor of the Turks. However, there are multitudes of stories, attributed to near past, describing entrapment of a man inside a wolf's skin, after which he accompanies the wolf pack to hunting missions. The man finally is freed and recounted his eighteen years adventures while he was a wolf.

== Personalities ==
Scarcity of attention and the daily rhythms of life and work makes people default to interacting with those few that matter and that reciprocate their attention. As the number of a members in a social grouping increases, most members lose their identity and only few come into prominence. The population in a village is too small for the identity loss to occur; everyone knows all inhabitants and value every individual's presence to some extent. Therefore, it is not fair to single out anyone as the personality of a particular village. Still, in line with the established rules of social reporting, we select Ashik Rasool Qorbani as the prominent personality of Abbasabad. Rasool was born on 1934 and started his music career in 1952. by 1965, Rasool was an accomplished Ashik and ever since his performances had been broadcast by Iranian Public broadcasters. Rasool had performed in international music festivals held in France, Germany, the Netherlands, England, Japan, China, Czech Republic, Slovakia, Austria, Australia, Azerbaijan, Serbia, Turkey and Hungary. Rasool has been awarded highest art awards of the country, and will be honored by government during the celebration for his 80th birthday.

We highlight two episodes of Rasool's life to provide a glimpse of village's social dynamic.

=== Rəsol and his lost chicken ===
A neighbor had mistaken Rəsol's chicken for a partridge and had shot it. Rəsol, trying to soothe his anger in civilized manner, composed a song with the opening verses;

Mənin töyoğom ağidi (my chicken was white),

dərisi dolo yağidi (it was fat up to its skin)

dünən bo vədə sağidi (yesterday at this hour it was alive)

Yandim yanasan töyoğ aparan (I am in agony, may the hunter suffer as well!) ...

Nowadays, this song is considered one of the most famous folkloric songs of the Azeri language.

=== Rəsol is credited with the post-revolution revival of Ashug music ===
After the Islamic revolution music was banned and Rəsol was forced to make a living as a travelling salesman. Then, he started composing songs with religious and revolutionary themes. The government realizing the propaganda potential of these songs allowed their broadcast in national radio and sent Rəsol to perform in some European cities. This facilitated the emergence of the Ashug music as the symbol of Azeri identity. At present Rəsol is invited as a VIP to most cultural events in Iran.

== The Bygone Days of Idyllic Life ==
Səhər səhər siğal verir—ayna qabağa gül xanim

Tay olmaz dağlarda lala—gülgəz yanaga gül xanim

These and similar lyrics by Azeri singers used to describe the mental imagery of the inhabitants; the image of a snow-white girl in undulating silk dress fetching crystal clear cool water from the nearby spring. Unfortunately, the unrelenting time passes its course and along takes the delight. Nowadays, bickering about petty land disputes and occasional melancholic sighs on the sweet memory of bygone days are the dominant theme of social gatherings. The adventures of late Rәcәb Kәtda -the local counterpart of Zorba the Greek- are no longer the integral part of collective narratives, Hac Zakeri and Mәşt Hәbib are deceased and with them has gone the spirit of generosity, Cәhanbәxş and Nәriman no longer are referred to as Khans, and, the deafening sound of the mills has long been silenced. Thus, it is more appropriate to quote a nostalgic poem by the legendary Mohammad-Hossein Shahriar;

یغدی خیر و برکت سفره سین ، احسانیله گئتدی (yiğdi xeyr o bərəkət süfrəsin, ehsanilə getdi)

امن امانلیق دا یوکون باغلادی ، ایمانیله گئتدیبی (əmn əmanliq da yükün bağladi imanilə getdi)

خان اولمازسا دئیه ردیک اولاجاق کندیمیز آباد (xan olmazsa diyərdik olacaq kəndimiz abad)

او خاراب کند ده ولاکن ، ائله بیک خانیله گئتدی (o xarab kən dv lakin elə bəy xanilə getdi)

سیلو دایر اولالی ، هرنه دگیرمان ییغیشدی (silo daiir olali hər nə dəgirman yiğişildi)

آمما خالص - تمیز اونلاردا ، دگیرمانیله گئتدی (amma xalis-təmiz ünlarda dəgirmanilə getdi)

مستبدسلطانی سالدوق ، کی اولا خلقیمیز آزاد (müstəbid soltani saldoq ki ola xəlqimiz azad)

سونرا باخدیق کی آزادلیق دا او سلطانیله گئتدی (sonra baxdiq ki azadliq da o soltanila getdi)

بیمسلمانه دئییردیک ، قولاغی توکلودی بدبخت (bir müsəlmanə diyərdik qolaği tüklidi bədbəxt)

ایندی باخ ، گؤر کی او دوزلوک ده ، مسلمانیله گئتدی (indi bax, gör ki o düzlük də müsəlmanilə gedi)

انسانیمیز آزدیر ، هامی انسان گرک اولسون ("insanimiz az dir," hami insan gərək olson)

آمما انسانلیقیمیزدا ، او آز انسانیله گئتدی (amma insanliqimiz da o az insanilə getdi)

ترکی اولموش قدغن ، دیوانیمیزدان دا خبر یوخ (Türki olmoş qədəğən, divanimizdan da xəbər yox)

شهریارین دیلی ده وای دئیه ، دیوانیله گئتدی (Şəhryarin dili də vay diyə divanilə getdi)
