= Chaparli =

Grassland in East Azerbaijan, Iran

38°53′52″N 46°51′22″E

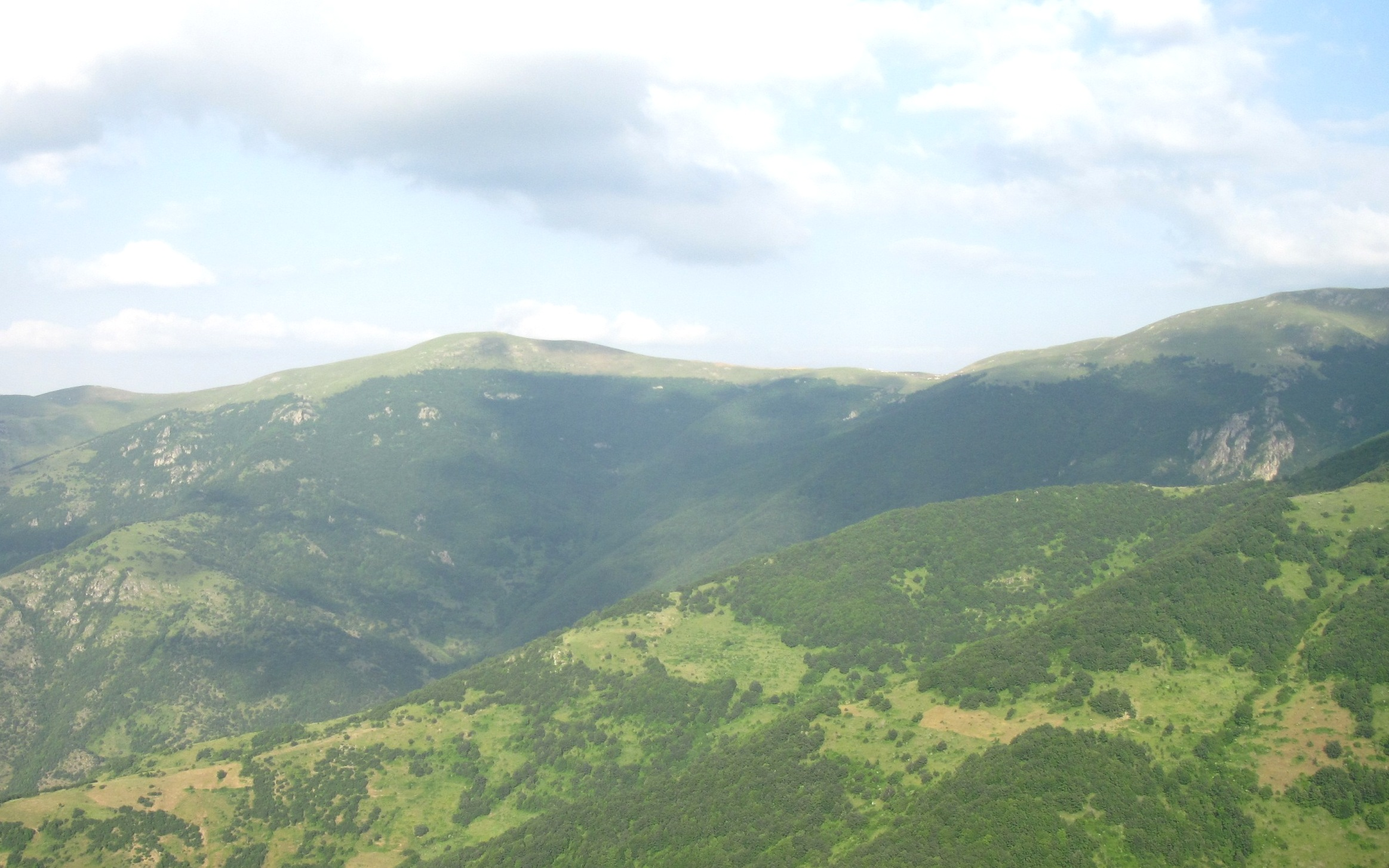
A view of Chaparli from Abbasabad village

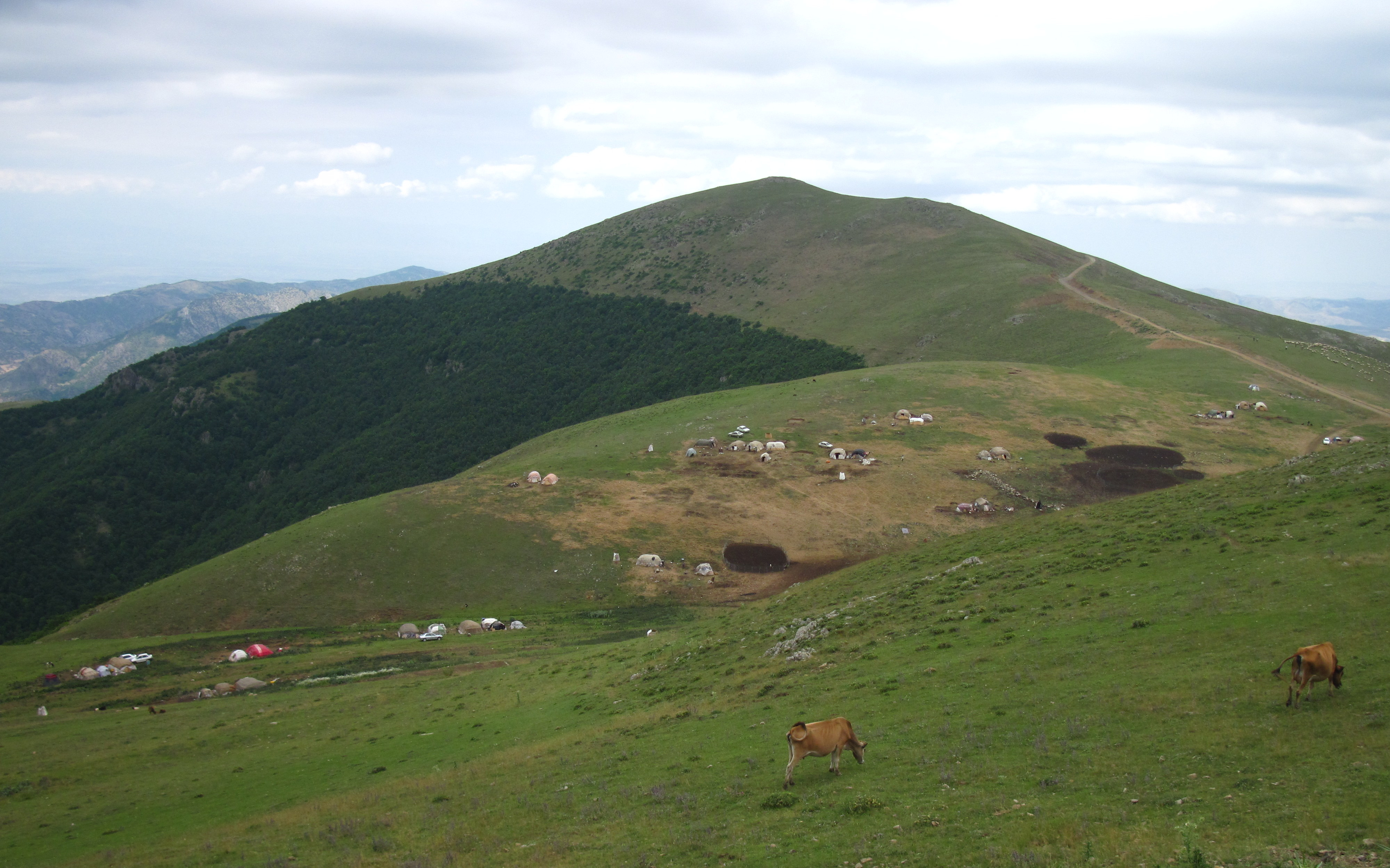
Encampment of pastoralists from Mohammad Khanlu tribe in Chaparli

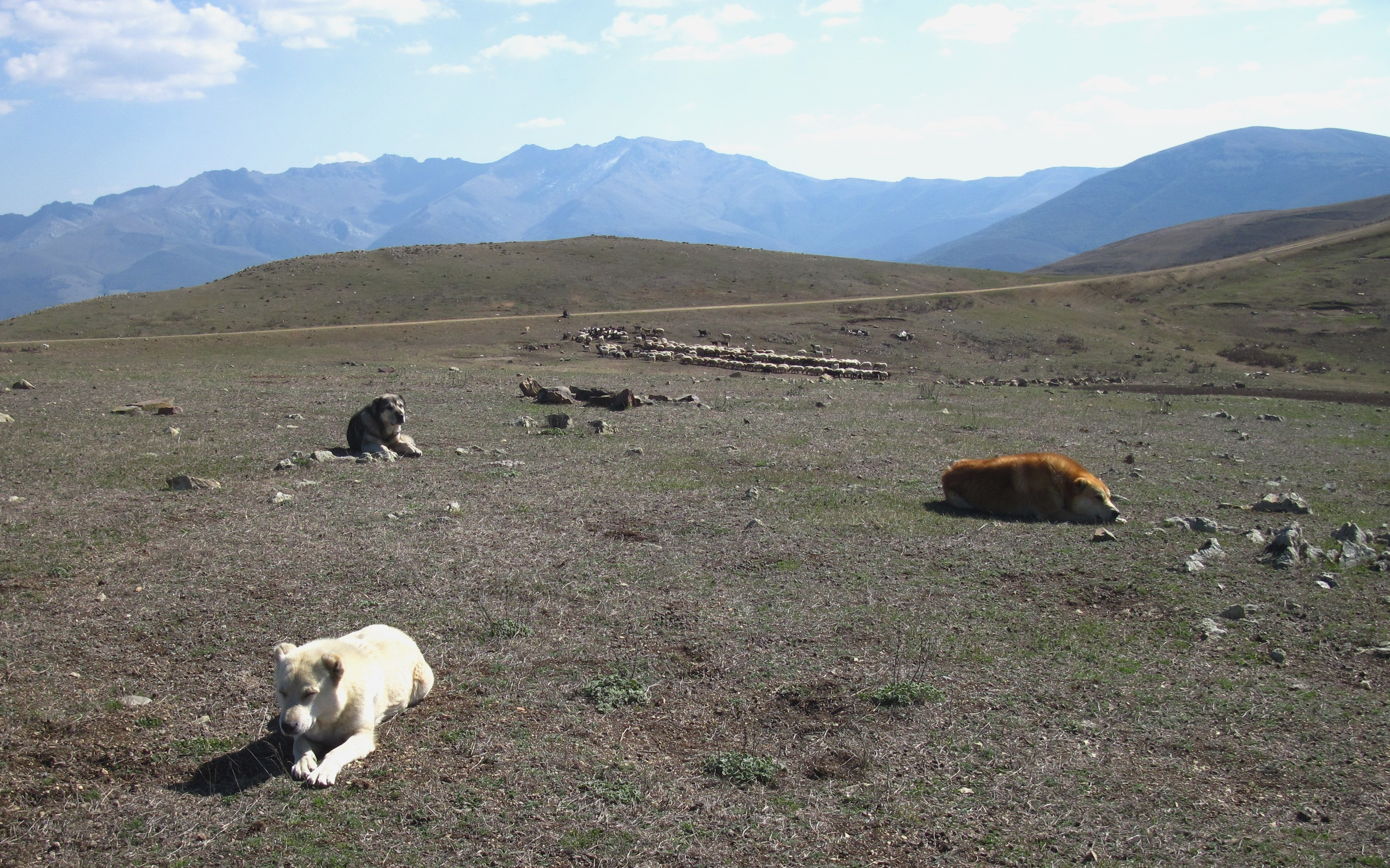
The aggressive shepherd dogs of Arasbaran are resting in Chapali.

Chaparli (چپرلی) is a grassland on a mountain range between the villages of Abbasabad and Oskolou. The area is the summer quarters of the Derilou branch of Mohammad Khanlu tribe. In the wake of White Revolution included 40 households. The number significantly dropped over years and in late 1990s no family migrated there for the lack of experienced shepherds. The trend later reversed, and about 20 families pitch their tents in the area, albeit mainly for escaping the hot climate of Derilou village.

Chaparli is a prime location for observing Arasbaran nomadic tribes. Moreover, the topography provides an excellent sightseeing opportunity. In addition to green mountain ranges, many scenic villages of Kaleybar County and Khoda Afarin County are visible.
