= Il Yurdi =

Il Yurdi ايل يوردي
- Village
- Location within Iran
- Coordinates: 39°00′39″N 47°09′45″E
- Country: Iran
- Province: East Azerbaijan
- County: Kaleybar
- Bakhsh: Abish Ahmad
- Rural District: Seyyedan

Population (2006)
  - Total: 108
- Time zone: UTC+3:30 (IRST)
  - Summer (DST): UTC+4:30 (IRDT)

Il Yurdi (Persian: ايل يوردي, also Romanized as Īl Yūrdī; also known as Shāh Goldī and Shāh Yūrdī) is a village in Seyyedan Rural District, Abish Ahmad District, Kaleybar County, East Azerbaijan Province, Iran. At the 2006 census, its population was 108, in 26 families.

In the wake of White Revolution (early 1960s) a clan of Mohammad Khanlu tribe, comprising 20 households, used Shāh Yūrdī as their winter quarters.
