= Mohammad Khanlu =

Kurdish tribe

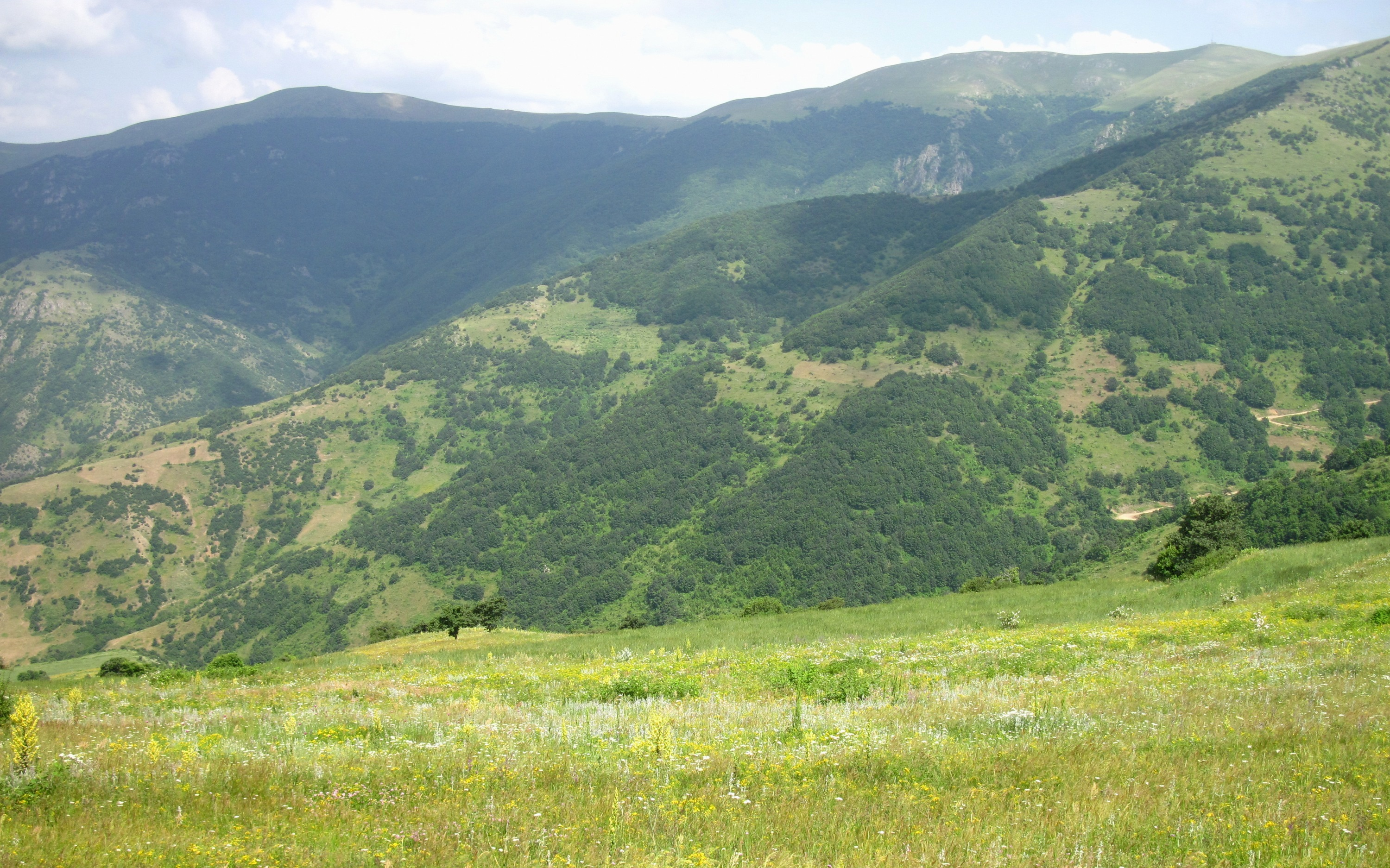
Chaparli summer camp near Abbasabad.

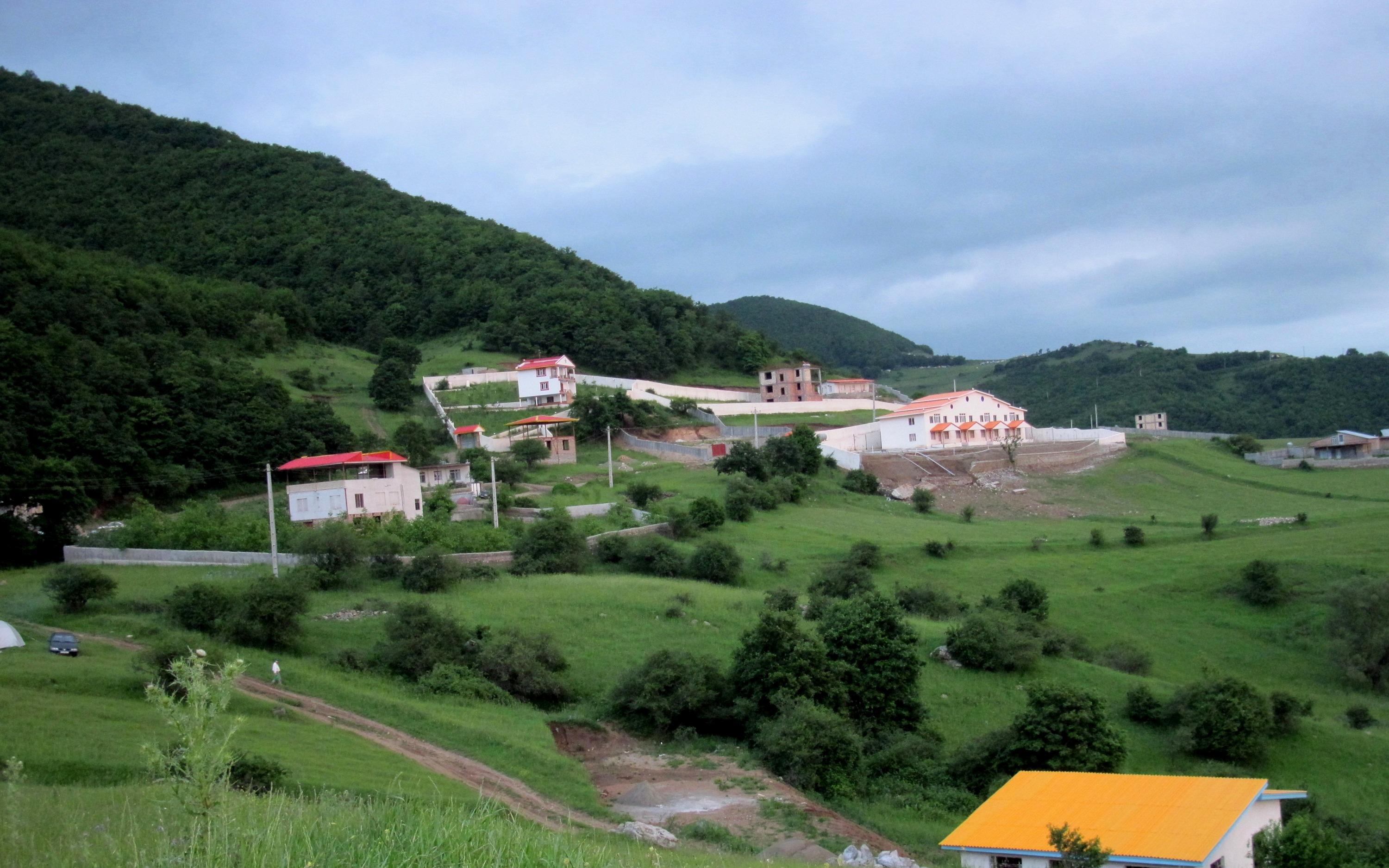
Summer residences in Garmanab.

Mohammad Khanlu (Moḥammad-Ḵānlū) (محمد خانلو) is one of the six major Tribes of Arasbaran. It is a Turkified Kurdish tribe dwelling for the most part in the Arasbaran region, in East Azerbaijan province of Iran. Its summer quarters were around Marzrud and its winter quarters were around Heydarkanlu village of Khoda Afarin County. According to A. Lampton, in Arasbaran the pasturage belonged to Khans, who also owned arable land in winter quarters.

At present the tribe is in most part sedentary, with majority of families living in suburbs of Tehran. Some descendants of the ruling Klan spend their summer in Chaparli pastures, and others in the recently erected villas in Garmanab.

== A brief history ==
The Mohammad Khanlus claim that their tribe were founded by Muhammad Khan in the Qajar period. After Muhammad Khan, the tribe has been successively ruled by Javad Khan, Samad Khan, Asadollah Khan, Abdollah Khan, and Asadollah Khan II. The last Khan, who was an MP at the wake of the Islamic Revolution, was briefly imprisoned and his property was confiscated.

During the civil wars following the Persian Constitutional Revolution of 1906, Mohammad Khanlus helped Rahimkhan Chalabianloo in his ill-fated campaign against revolutionaries. After Rahimkhan's defeat in 1909, the power vacuum in Garaja Dagh was filled by Amir Arshad of Haji-Alilu tribe. He helped revolutionary forces to crush Mohammad Khanlus in the winter of 1910.

During the autonomous ruling of Azerbaijan by Azerbaijan People's Government, from November 1945 to November 1946, Mohammad Khanlus sided with the reactionary forces and conducted sporadic guerrilla activities. Consequently, their headman, Abdollah Khan, and his nephew, Rezaqoli Khan, were arrested and executed.

== The status of Mohammad Khanlus in the wake of White Revolution ==
In the wake of White Revolution (early 1960s) the Mohammad Khanlus were divided into 23 clans, each taking their name from the village where they spent their winter. The number of households are indicated in parentheses and are

Heydarkanlu (the ruling clan; 60), Safarlu (55), Tu Ali-ye Sofla (50), Tu Ali-ye Olya (35), Zarnaq (35), Khomarlu (60), Hemidan Kirashan (80), Jānānlū (60), Derilou (40), Shojailu and Mafrūẕlū (80), Kurzeh (16), Sutan and Masjedlu (120), Talan Dereh (70), Bayduq (30), Lowtejan (50), Seqehsay (50), Gavahan (50), Qeshlaq-e Karanlu (40), Ebriq (25), Ham Neshin (25), Mashhad Hasanlu (25), Shāh Yūrdī (20).

In addition, by 1960 some families had already settled in the villages and had become farmers. Most notable among these villages were Abbasabad, Garmanab and Alherd, where minor Khans of the ruling clan were residing.
