= Manjavan-e Sharqi Rural District =

Rural district in East Azerbaijan province, Iran

Manjavan-e Sharqi Rural District Persian: دهستان منجوان شرقي
- Rural District
- Location within Iran
- Coordinates: 39°03′N 46°53′E
- Country: Iran
- Province: East Azerbaijan
- County: Khoda Afarin
- District: Manjavan
- Established: 1987
- Capital: Janan Lu

Population (2016)
  - Total: 5,066
- Time zone: UTC+3:30 (IRST)

Manjavan-e Sharqi Rural District (Persian: دهستان منجوان شرقي) is in Manjavan District of Khoda Afarin County, East Azerbaijan province, Iran. Its capital is the village of Janan Lu.

== Demographics ==
=== Population ===
At the time of the 2006 National Census, the rural district's population (as a part of the former Khoda Afarin District in Kaleybar County) was 5,727 in 1,376 households. There were 5,213 inhabitants in 1,460 households at the following census of 2011, by which time the district had been separated from the county in the establishment of Khoda Afarin County. The rural district was transferred to the new Manjavan District. The 2016 census measured the population of the rural district as 5,066 in 1,715 households. The most populous of its 37 villages was Janan Lu, with 1,742 people.

=== Other villages in the rural district ===
- Dari Lu
- Tatar-e Olya
- Tu Ali-ye Sofla
