= Manjavan District =

District in East Azerbaijan province, Iran

Manjavan District Persian: بخش منجوان
- District
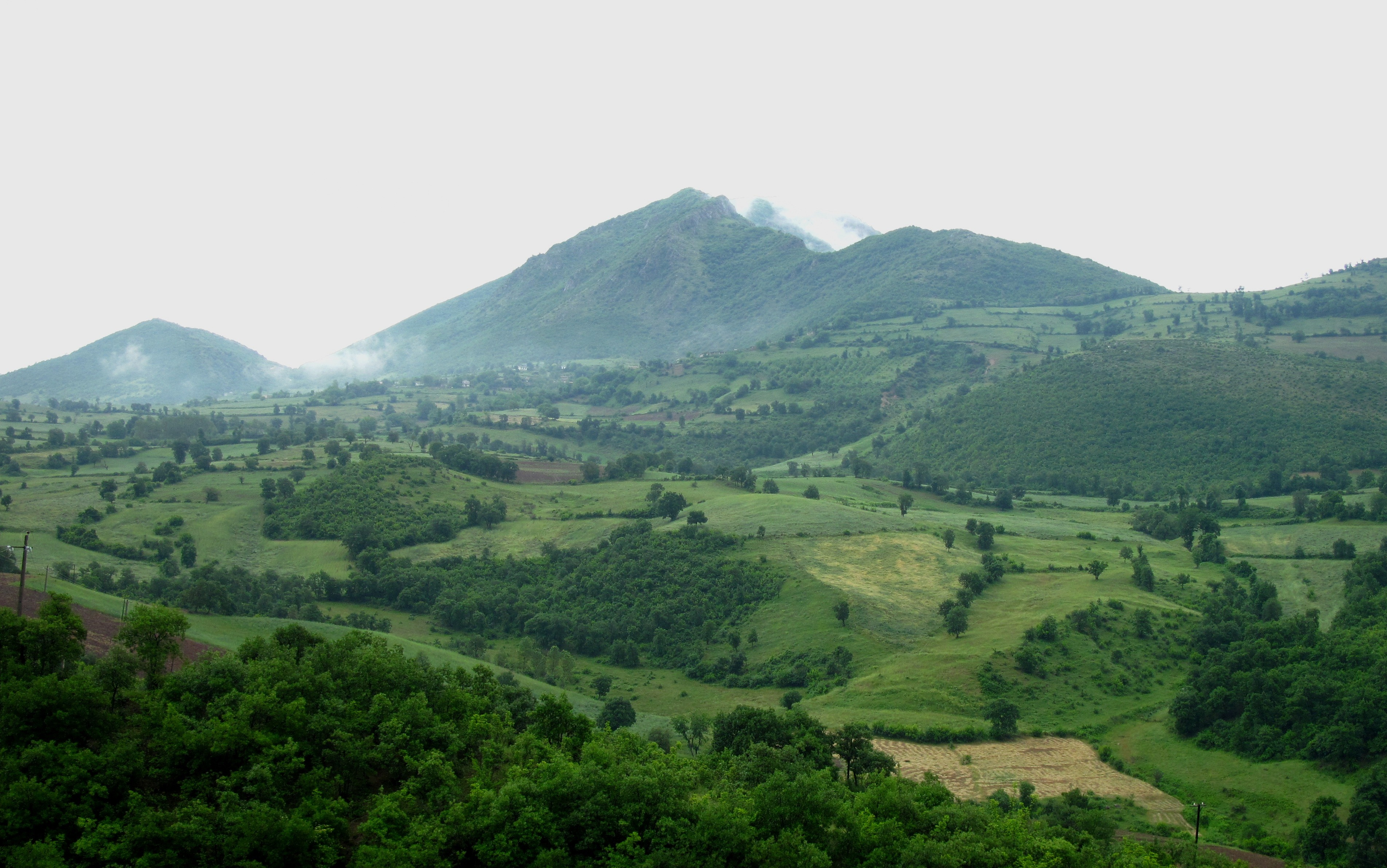
- Wheat farms near Asheqlu

- Location within Iran
- Coordinates: 38°57′N 46°45′E
- Country: Iran
- Province: East Azerbaijan
- County: Khoda Afarin
- Established: 2010
- Capital: Asheqlu

Population (2016)
  - Total: 11,920
- Time zone: UTC+3:30 (IRST)

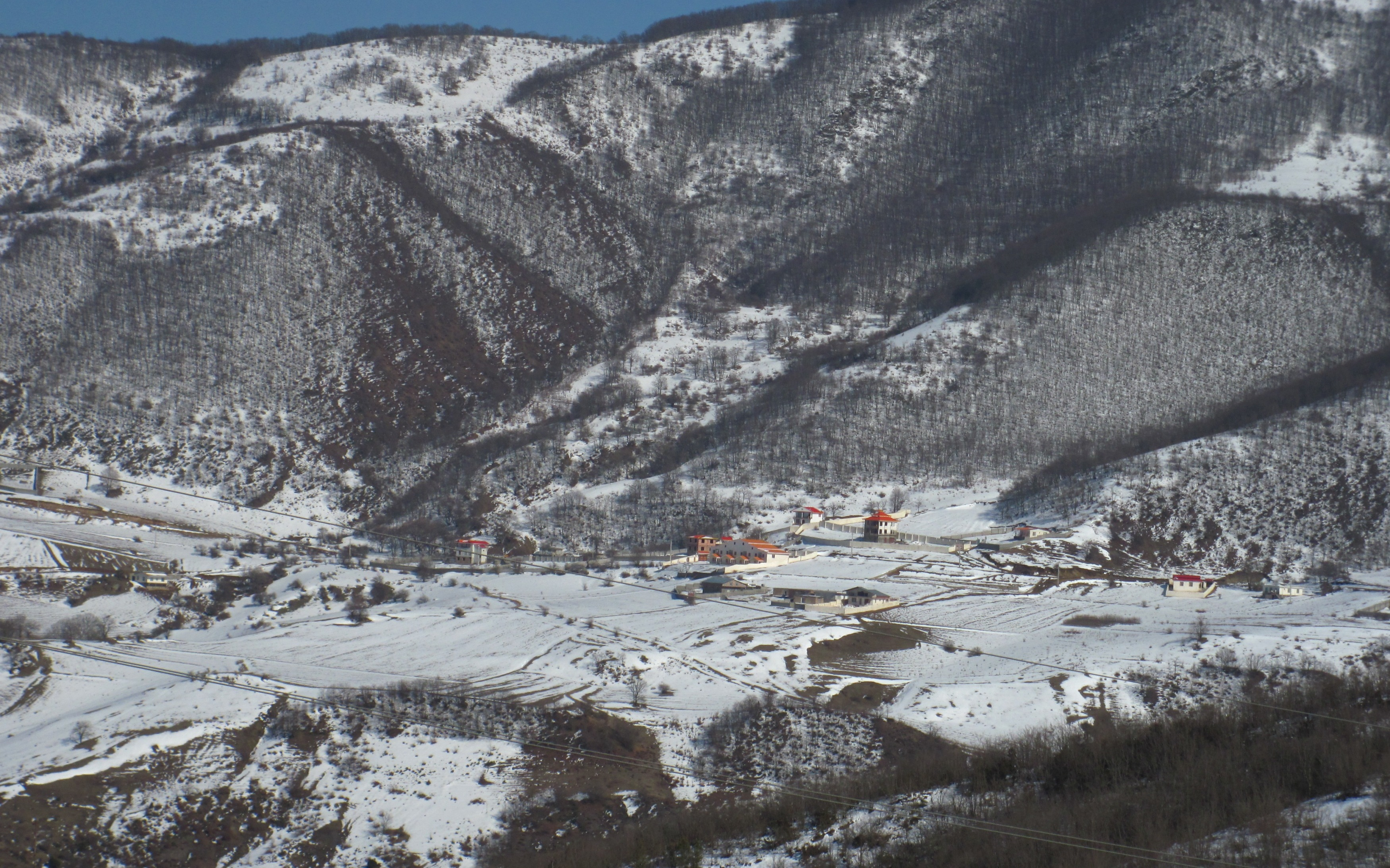
Typical winter scene near the village of Garmanab

Manjavan District (Persian: بخش منجوان) (Note: Armenian: Մնջեան Գաւառակ) is in Khoda Afarin County, East Azerbaijan province, Iran. Its capital is the village of Asheqlu.

== History ==
The only noteworthy allusion to the district in official records relates to an appeal by the inhabitants of the district to the interior minister of Iran, requesting protection from the "abuses by Mohammad Khanlu family."

In 2010, Khoda Afarin District was separated from Kaleybar County in the establishment of Khoda Afarin County, which was divided into three districts and seven rural districts, with Khomarlu as its capital and only city at the time.

== Demographics ==
=== Population ===
At the time of the 2011 census, the district's population was 12,524 people in 3,388 households. The 2016 census measured the population of the district as 11,920 inhabitants in 3,864 households.

The online edition of the Dehkhoda Dictionary, quoting Iranian Army files, reports a population of 8,464 people in the late 1940s. At that time Janan Lu, Asheqlu, Dash Bashi, and Setan were the most important villages of the district. There are 22 villages which are no longer populated.

Manjavan District Population
Administrative Divisions	2011	2016
Dizmar-e Sharqi RD	3,097	2,760
Manjavan-e Gharbi RD	4,214	4,094
Manjavan-e Sharqi RD	5,213	5,066
Total	12,524	11,920
RD = Rural District
