= Karg (disambiguation) =

The Kargs are a fictional people in Ursula K. Le Guin's Earthsea canon.

Karg may also refer to:

- Karg, Battagram, a village council in the Khyber Pakhtunkhwa province of Pakistan
- Karg (surname), with a list of people of this name
- A Masters of the Universe character; see Masters of the Universe (1987 film)

== See also ==
- KARG (disambiguation)
- Kharg (disambiguation)
