= Kharg, Iran =

Kharg, Iran may refer to:

- Kharg District
  - Kharg (city)
- Kharg Island
