= Kharg =

Kharg may refer to:

- Kharg Island, Iran
- Kharg, Iran, a city on the island
- Kharg District, an administrative subdivision of Iran
- IRIS Kharg, a ship of the Iranian navy
