= Achaemenid inscription on Kharg Island =

Inscription

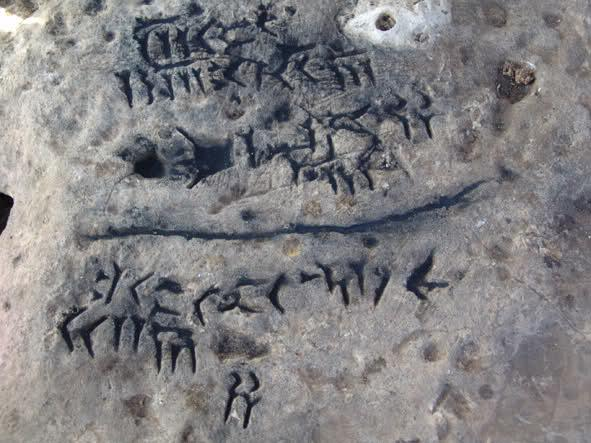
Inscription before its destruction

The Achaemenid inscription on Kharg Island is an important inscription from the Achaemenid Empire (550–330 BCE) on Kharg Island, off the coast of Iran.

== Discovery ==
On 14 November 2007, an Achaemenid-era cuneiform inscription in Old Persian, carved on a coral rock, was discovered while constructing a road on Kharg Island, Iran. Construction was halted, and eventually the road was rerouted.

== The inscription ==
The inscription, estimated to be around 2400 years old, is written in the Old Persian language with the Old Persian cuneiform semi-syllabic alphabet. The height and the width of the inscription are around 1 m (3 ft 3 in), and the rock is around 85 cm (33 in) x 116 cm (46 in). Despite the usually well-ordered regular system of Achaemenid inscriptions, this one is in an unusual order, written in five lines, and contained six Old Persian words, five of which were unknown at the time it was discovered.

The inscription has been translated in various ways:

1. "[This] land was wilderness and without water [and] I brought happiness and welfare to it."
2. "The not irrigated land was happy [with] me bringing out [water]".
3. "[This] land was a dry area with no water; [I] brought happiness and welfare,... water wells." (Note: Translation by Rasul Bashshash, an expert at the Archaeological Research Center of Iran.)

The linguist Habib Borjian explains that if the inscription is authentic, combined with the island's known history of qanat usage, (Note: The 17th-century French traveller Jean de Thévenot noted the presence of qanats (ancient irrigation systems) on the island.) which began under Achaemenid rule in the Near East, it can be suggested that there was a Persian colonisation of Kharg under the Achaemenids. The Iranian dialect of the Persian settlers of the Achaemenid era may have in turn been the ancestor of the Khargi language.

The inscription became a contentious issue in the Persian Gulf naming dispute; some experts said it was further evidence of the Persian name for the Persian Gulf. This led to a "media frenzy" in surrounding Arab countries, where efforts were made to disprove its authenticity.

== Vandalism ==
On 31 May 2008, the inscription was seriously damaged by vandal(s). After climbing a fence, they destroyed it with a sharp object, leaving (according to Khark Deputy Governor Ali Jazebi) about 70% of the inscription seriously damaged; another source said only 10-15% was damaged. The nature of the damage indicates that it was done deliberately. The Cultural Heritage, Handcrafts and Tourism Organization of Iran said that it was related to the Persian Gulf naming dispute. The Bushehr Cultural Heritage, Tourism and Handicrafts Department (BCHTHD) said that they had begun a process to prosecute the suspected vandals. The police were responsible for guarding the site. However, according to the BCHTHD spokesman, the artefact was not adequately guarded owing to the lack of a guardhouse, as the National Iranian Oil Company, which owns the island, did not provide the land for one.
