= Khargi language =

Southwestern Iranian language of Iran

Khargi
- ئِێسْنِير
- Native to: Iran
- Region: Kharg Island
- Language family: Indo-European: Indo-Iranian; Iranian; Western; Southwestern; Khargi

Language codes
- ISO 639-3: None (mis)
- Glottolog: None

Khargi is a Southwestern Iranian language spoken on the Iranian island of Kharg in the Persian Gulf.

== Classification ==
Khargi is related to the Iranian languages of Fars province and those along the littoral areas down to the Strait of Hormuz. The language was first documented in the late 1950s by the publicist Jalal Al-e Ahmad, who reported in his ethnography that out of the 120 resident households who then inhabited the island, most had migrated from the coastal areas of Tangestan with only a minority of the population being locals. The native speakers of Khargi at the time characterized the language as a dialect close to that of Tangestan and Bushehr.

== Status ==
Within the next few decades, as Kharg transformed from an isolated rural society into a petroleum export hub, large-scale social and demographic changes took place, with Persian becoming the dominant language in all spheres of life. Fieldwork on Kharg by the linguist Habib Borjian in 2016 showed that Khargi was still spoken "by as few as a dozen families, and even therein it was not properly transmitted to the next generation". Borjian adds that the "rest of the local population of the island was either the indigenous Khargis who had lost the native language or the immigrants from nearby littoral settlements who spoke their own kindred dialects". Worried about its extinction, the local Khargi speakers however have published new materials on the Khargi language, including poetry and proverbs.

== History ==
Borjian explains that sustaining human life on Kharg in a continuous way was mainly made possible due to a continuous water supply. However, due to low amounts of rainfall, people brought underground water from aquifers in the central foothills of the islands down to the fields by using manmade subterranean channels known as kariz. Due to the fact that historically sustainable farming on Kharg was only possible using kariz, Borjian points out that a permanent human settlement on the island "cannot predate the spread of the kariz, which came about under the Achaemenid rule in the Near East (550–330 BCE)".

In 2007, a rock graffiti inscription was discovered on Kharg with a short writing in Old Persian cuneiform. The Old Persian inscription, according to preliminary decipherment, reads: “The not irrigated land was happy [with] my bringing out [of water]”. Borjian explains that although this reading has neither been confirmed nor disputed by other experts, "it accords perfectly with the possible beginning of a permanent human settlement on the Kharg island". Borjian narrates that if the inscription turns out to be authentic, it can be suggested that there was a Persian colonisation of Kharg under the Persian Achaemenid rulers. Borjian adds that the language of the Achaemenid-era Persian settlers could very well be the ancestor of the Khargi language, noting that "there is no contradicting evidence to make this hypothesis implausible". Simultaneously however, given Khargi's multidirectional agreements with various South Iranian languages, polygenesis is implied. Borjian concludes:

Given the divergent historical contexts of the island, this outcome is hardly surprising. Kharg’s population was surely composed in part of refugees, sailors, and skilled labourers who settled on the island individually or in groups, and new settlers would have added strata to the original language. This multilayered Iranian-speaking community sustained itself by means of highly specialised skills of agriculture, pearling, and piloting sea commerce before the advent of petroleum industry which changed the sociolinguistic texture of the island.

== Sources ==
- Borjian, Habib (2019). "The Language of the Kharg Island". Journal of the Royal Asiatic Society. 29 (4): 659–682. doi:10.1017/S1356186319000403. S2CID 213053987.
