= Persian–Dutch War =

1765 war over Kharg island

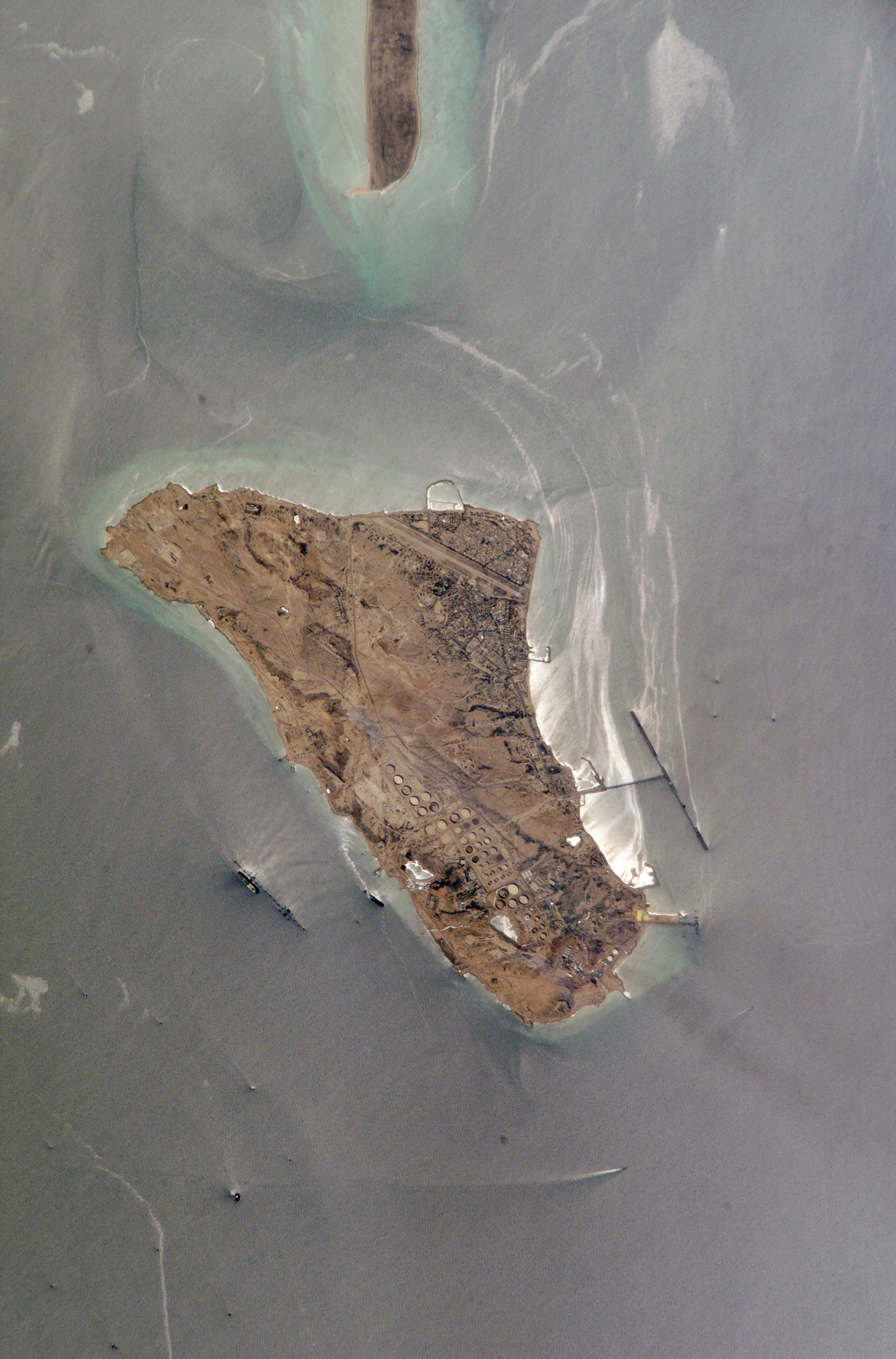
- Satellite image of the strategic island of Kharg
Date	Naval battle: 12 December 1765; Land battle: 22 December 1765
Location	Kharg, Iran
Result	Persian victory
Territorial changes	Expulsion of the Dutch from Khark Island

Belligerents
Zand Iran	Dutch East India Company

Commanders and leaders
Muhammad Ali Khan; Sadiq Khan	(Dutch East India Company) Petron Hooting (surrendered) (Dutch East India Company) Baron Kneiphausen

Strength
Unknown (probably 70 people)	Naval battle: 40+ Europeans and 18 local sailors 2 Galliot warships and a Dutch cargo ship Land battle: 80 European soldiers and 120 local sailors

Casualties and losses
Naval battle: Low; Land battle: Low	Unknown

The Persian–Dutch War or Iranian–Dutch War (Persian: جنگ ایران و هلند) was a 1765 military conflict between Zand Iran and the Dutch East India Company.

== Background ==
Mir Mahna had invaded the Kharg islands earlier in 1762, but was repulsed by the Dutch. Petronhoting, the commander of the Dutch and in charge of the Dutch East India Company in the Persian Gulf at the time, who was stationed in Fort Mosselstein and had lost an important part of his naval power, asked for help from Sheikh Saadun Bushehri, but Saadun made excuses because he was afraid of Mirmahna's attacks. In the end, he did not go to the help of his Dutch friends. Mir mahna landed part of his forces on Kharg Island (which was captured by the Dutch during the occupation of Kharg) near the Armenian neighborhood and away from the Dutch cannons. On 1 December (22 December 1765) they attacked and besieged Fort Mosselstein, until they captured it after some time.

== Battle ==
On 12 December 1765 (21 December 1144), a Dutch ship reached Kharg from Basra, and the Dutch from Kharg sent their 2 Galliot warships to welcome and escort that ship. In order to avoid the attack of Mir Mahna in Khargo Island was to be protected, but Mir Mahna, on the orders of Karim Khan Zand with his men captured not only the mentioned cargo ship but also 2 Dutch warships and captured 40 European passengers and 18 local sailors.

== See also ==
- Dutch–Safavid relations
- Portuguese–Safavid wars
- Naval history of Iran
