= Persian Gulf naming dispute =

Geographic naming dispute

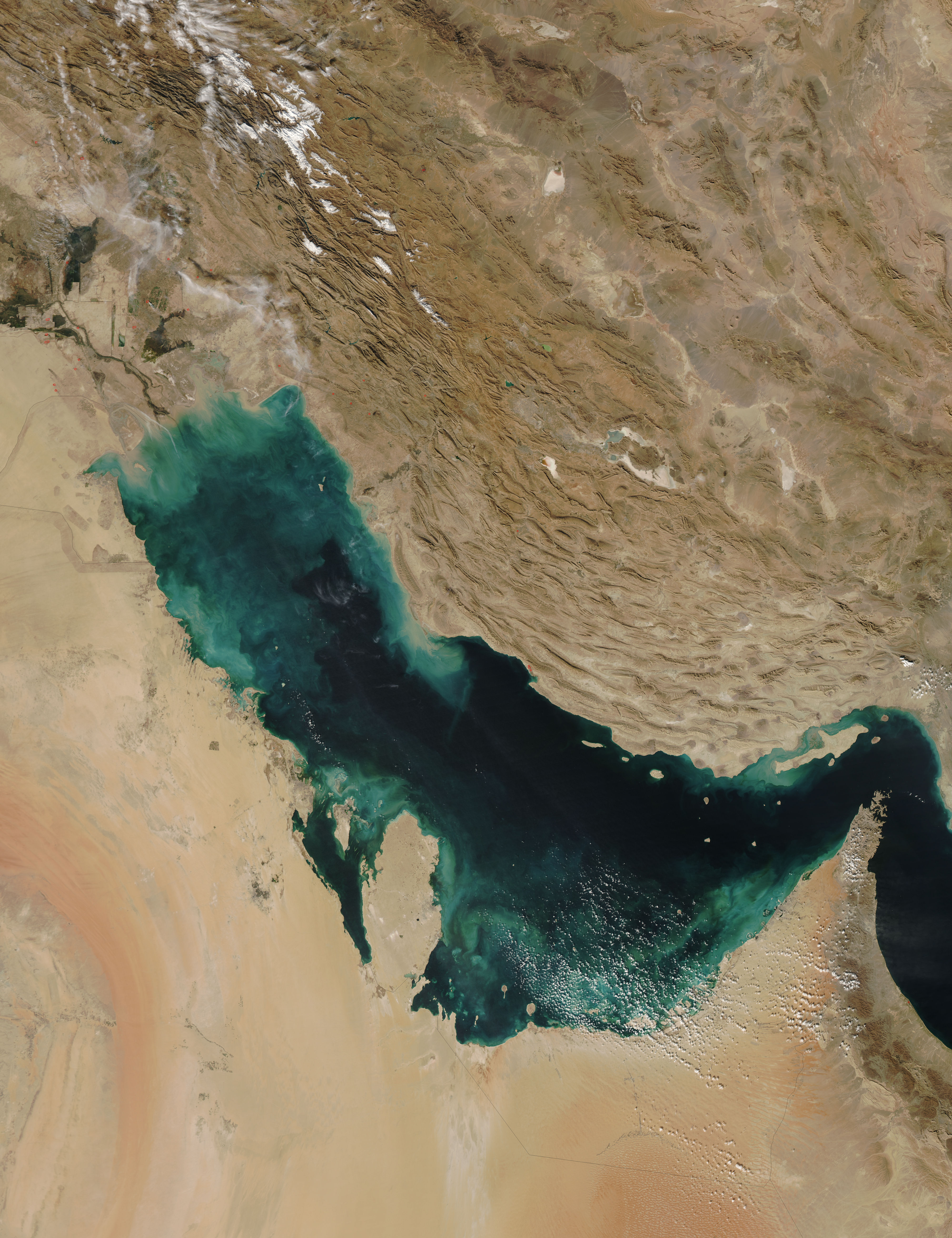
Satellite imagery of the Persian Gulf, 2007 (NASA)

The Persian Gulf naming dispute concerns the gulf known historically and internationally as the Persian Gulf, after Iran (historically known as Persia or Persis and the homeland of the Persian people) became involved in an ongoing naming dispute.

The name "Persian Gulf" has been in use since at least the 10th century by Arab historians and geographers. In connection with the emergence of pan-Arabism and Arab nationalism in the 1960s, the usage of "Arabian Gulf" (Arabic: الخليج العربي) as well as just "The Gulf" increased.

The body of water is internationally recognized as the Persian Gulf. Arab governments refer to it as the "Arabian Gulf" or "The Gulf". The name "Gulf of Iran (Persian Gulf)" is used by the International Hydrographic Organization, which seeks to standardise the names of the world's bodies of water.

== History ==
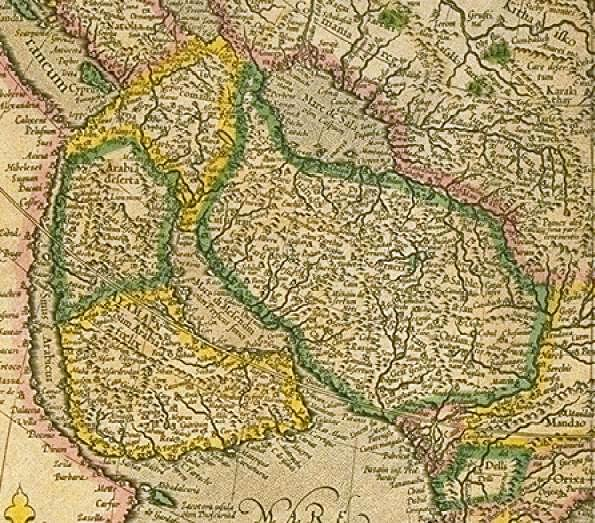
Gerard Mercator's map of 1595 showing Persian Gulf terminology (Mare di Mesendin formerly Persicus sinus), and Sinus Arabicus (Red Sea)

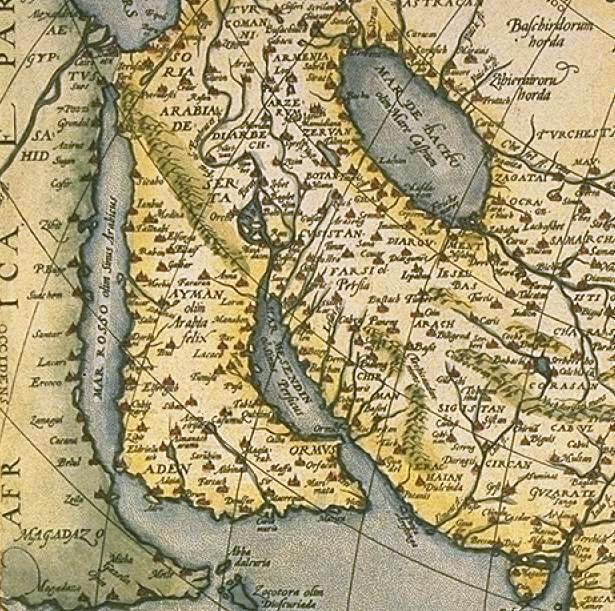
Map by Abraham Ortelius, dated 1580 using the term "Persicus" (MAR MESENDIN (formerly Sinus Persicus))

This body of water was referred to as the Persian Gulf by Arab historians and geographers, including the Melkite Arabic-speaking historian Agapius, writing in the 10th century.

According to authors Philip L. Kohl, Mara Kozelsky, and Nachman Ben-Yehuda in their work Selective Remembrances, Sir Charles Belgrave (British adviser to the ruler of Bahrain) was "the first westerner to use and advocate the name 'Arabian gulf', first in the journal Soat al-Bahrain (Voice of Bahrain) in 1955." Mahan Abedin of The Jamestown Foundation agrees with this, noting that Arab countries used the term "Persian Gulf" until the 1960s. However, with the rise of Arab nationalism during that decade, some Arab countries, including the ones bordering the Gulf, adopted widespread use of the term الخليج العربي (al-Khalīj al-ʻArabī; Arab Gulf or Arabian Gulf) to refer to this waterway. Teymoor Nabili (a senior presenter for Al Jazeera English) said "ironically, among the major drivers of the movement for change were Arab perceptions that Iran, driven by Washington, had supported Israel during the Arab-Israeli war of 1973".

The capture of Baghdad by the Ottoman Empire in 1534 gave Turkey access to the Indian Ocean via the port of Basra at the head of the Persian Gulf. This coincided with the early mapmaking efforts of Gerard Mercator, whose 1541 terrestrial globe attempts to give the most up-to-date information, naming the gulf Sinus Persicus, nunc Mare de Balsera ("Persian Gulf, now Sea of Basra"). However, on his world map of 1569, the name is changed to Mare di Mesendin (after the peninsula Ra's Musandam, in modern-day Oman), while his rival Abraham Ortelius, for the world atlas of 1570, opted for Mare El Catif, olim Sinus Persicus (after the Arabian port of Al Qatif), but labelled the entrance to the gulf – the present-day Strait of Hormuz – as Basora Fretum (Strait of Basra). Among all this confusion, the old name gradually reasserted itself in the 17th century, but Turkey still uses the name "Gulf of Basra" (Basra Körfezi) in Turkish today.

Following British attempts to establish control over the seaway in the late 1830s, the Times Journal, published in London in 1840, referred to the Persian Gulf as the "Britain Sea", but this name was never used in any other context.

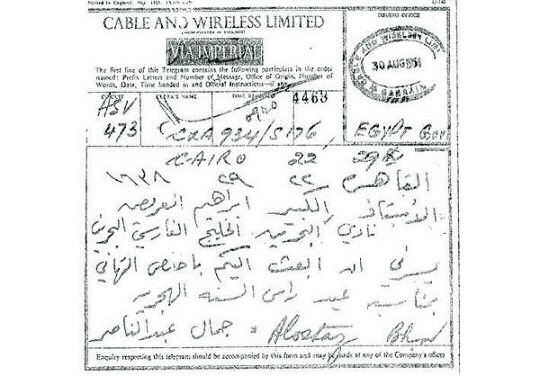
Official letter from Egyptian president Nasser in August 1951 using name "Persian Gulf" (الخليج الفارسي)

An official letter from Egyptian president Gamal Abdel Nasser to a Bahraini government official dated 30 August 1951; (that is, before the initiation of Nasser's pan-Arabist policies) uses the name "Persian Gulf" (الخليج الفارسي).

The discovery of the Achaemenid inscription on Kharg Island in 2007, which was written in the Old Persian language with the Old Persian cuneiform semi-syllabic alphabet, and estimated to be around 2400 years old, became a contentious issue in the naming dispute.

== Proposed alternatives ==
The matter remains very contentious as the competing naming conventions are supported by certain governments in internal literature, but also in dealings with other states and international organizations. Some parties use terms like "The Gulf" or the "Arabo-Persian Gulf". Following the Iranian Revolution of 1979 some people in Islamic groups suggested the use of "Islamic Gulf" or "Muslim Gulf". The originator of the term Islamic Gulf is not known, while some people suggest that prominent figures of the early years of the Islamic republic including Ruhollah Khomeini, Mehdi Bazargan, and Sadegh Khalkhali may have supported the idea. During his May 1979 visit to the UAE, Khalkhali suggested the term "Muslim Gulf". The idea was quickly abandoned after Iran was invaded by its predominantly Muslim neighbor, Iraq, in the Iran–Iraq War.

In Arab countries the terms "Gulf" and "Arabian Gulf" are preferred:

The "Gulf" refers to the body of water known as the Arabian Gulf in GCC countries, or the Persian Gulf as referred to in many other places.

— List of GCC countries, Gulf countries

=== Iranian viewpoint ===
American journalist Mike Wallace interviews Iranian king Mohammad Reza Pahlavi in 1974 for CBS's 60 Minutes. Pahlavi uses the name "Persian Gulf" in the video.

Iran only uses the term "Persian Gulf" and does not usually recognize the naming when it is referred to as "Arabian Gulf" or just the "Gulf" or by any other alternative.

In a 1974 interview by Mike Wallace in 60 Minutes, the last Shah of Iran himself preferred the term "Persian Gulf" while talking to Wallace. In February 2010, Iran threatened to ban from its airspace foreign airlines, especially those from the Gulf region, who did not use the term "Persian Gulf". In 2011, President Mahmoud Ahmadinejad made a speech at the United Nations General Assembly where he said that the only correct name of the sea between Iran and the Arabian peninsula was the Persian Gulf, and he dismissed the use of any other names as "illegitimate and void".

In 2012, the Iranian government threatened to sue Google over its decision not to label the gulf with any name, warning it would face "serious damages" if it does not denote the area as the Persian Gulf.

Iran officially designated 30 April as National Persian Gulf Day. The date coincides with the anniversary of Abbas the Great's successful military campaign when the Portuguese navy was driven out of the Strait of Hormuz in the Capture of Ormuz (1622). The decision was taken by the High Council of Cultural Revolution, presided over by former President Mohammad Khatami, noting that the campaign launched in 2009 by certain Arab states to rename the Persian Gulf was the driver behind the decision. The Iranian postal authority issued a series of stamps commemorating the day.

=== Arab viewpoints ===
Gamal Abdel Nasser mentioning the name "Persian Gulf" in Arabic in a speech.
Former Egyptian President Gamal Abdel Nasser using the name "Persian Gulf"
Arabic:من المحیط الاطلسی الی الخلیج الفارسی
English:From the Atlantic to the Persian Gulf

Gulf Cooperation Council states prefer the use of the term "Arabian Gulf".

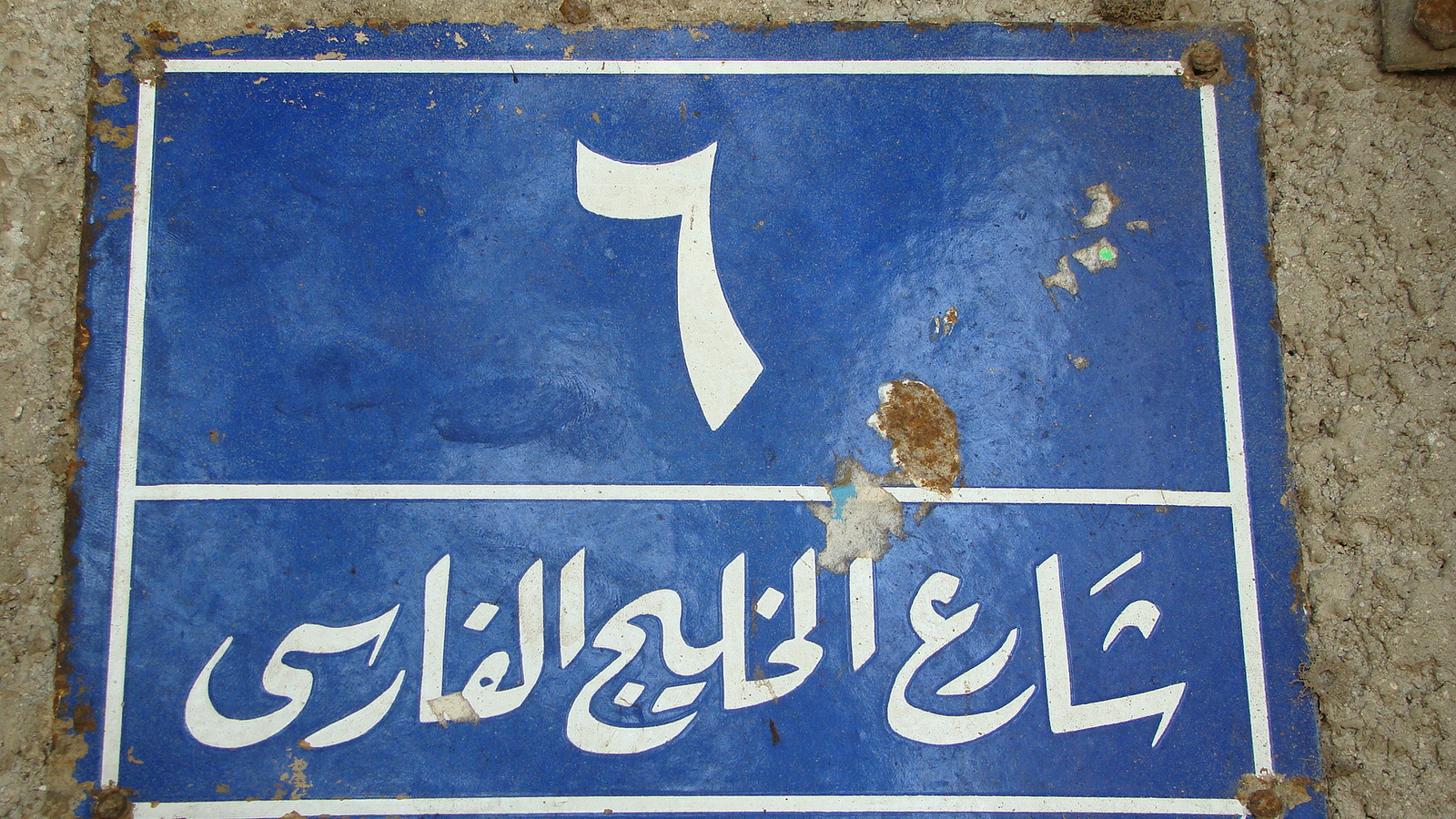
Shāri' al-Khalīj al-Fārsī (Arabic: شارع الخليج الفارسي), the Persian Gulf Street in Cairo, Egypt

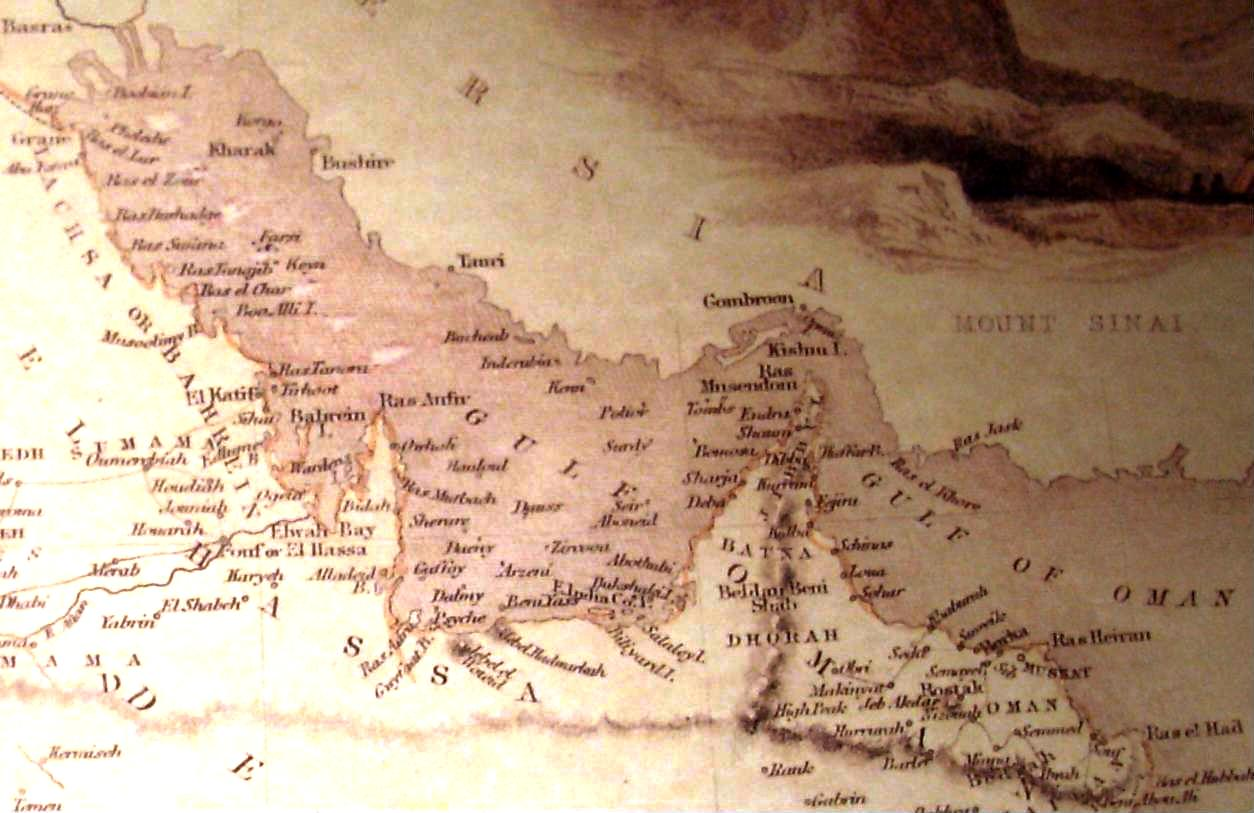
A historical map of the Persian Gulf in Saeed Al Maktoum House, Dubai, United Arab Emirates. The word "Persian" is erased from the phrase "Persian Gulf".

Abdel Khaleq al-Janabi, a Saudi Arabian historian, said "It's this name [Persian Gulf] that has been retained by history books and Arab historians, like Ibn Khaldoun and Ibn al Athir. It's also in treaties signed between the governors of the gulf and the British who dominated the region from the beginning of the 20th century ... From a scientific and historical point of view, it has been called the Persian Gulf since Alexander the Great". He said that it was "without foundation" to claim the Romans named it "Arabian Gulf". "Things didn't change until Nasser came to power and the rise of Arab nationalism. The Arabs then began to use the name 'Arabian Gulf'", he added.

In an interview with Al Wasat, Bahraini writer Hussain al-Baharna said one of the reasons for the dispute over naming the "Arabian Gulf as the Persian Gulf" is that the Red Sea was referred to as at the time of negotiations over the ownership of Bahrain "that Arabian Gulf", and it was not then possible to call what had since become the Arab Gulf region by the name "Arabian Gulf", it was called the "Persian Gulf" at that time. In recent decades, prominent scholars and political and religious leaders, including Professor Abdelhadi Tazi, Ahmad al-Saraf, Abdelilah Benkirane (Prime Minister of Morocco from 2011 to 2017), Abdul Monem Saeed, Abdul Khaliq al-Janabi, Qaradawi, and Gen. Majdi Omar, Former First Deputy of the Egyptian National Defense Council have supported the use of "Persian Gulf" and believe there is a lack of justification for changing the name.

On the more general trend, the Arabs only decided to use the term "Arabian Gulf" beginning in the 1950s and 1960s, during a time when Arab nationalism was at its height and seeing its peak. It is from this era onward that the term "Arabian Gulf" became commonly used by some Arab states to describe the Gulf. Part of the continued usage of the term "Arabian Gulf" by Arab states comes from the distrust of Arab states towards Iran; one aspect of this is the Arabs' fear Iranian domination in the region. These concerns have resulted in the symbolic strategies to proclaim the region as broadly "Arabic". According to some scholars, this dispute is symptomatic of the broader regional problem: it has much more to do with role perception alongside the balance of power in the region, an issue constantly present between Iran and the Arab world.

== International viewpoints ==
=== United Nations ===
The United Nations Group of Experts on Geographical Names discussed the naming issue during its 23rd session, held in Vienna from 28 March to 4 April 2006.

=== International Hydrographic Organization ===
The International Hydrographic Organization (IHO), an international body for provision of hydrographic information for worldwide marine navigation and other purposes, uses the name "Gulf of Iran (Persian Gulf)" for this body of water, in the third edition of its standard S-23 (Limits of Oceans and Seas), section 41, published in 1953. The draft of the fourth edition, published in 2002, uses the same name.

=== United States ===
American president Barack Obama using the name "Persian Gulf" as part of his "Nowruz Message to the Iranian People" in 2015

The United States National Geospatial-Intelligence Agency GEOnet Names Server (GNS) is the "official repository of standard spellings of all foreign place names" sanctioned by the Board of Geographical Names (BGN). The GNS lists "Persian Gulf" as the Conventional name, along with 16 Variant names in different languages, such as "Gulf of Iran", "Gulf of Ajam", "Gulf of Basra", "Arabian Gulf", "Persian-Arabian Gulf", "Gulf of Fars", and "Farsi Gulf".

In Persian Gulf States Country Studies published in 1993 by the Federal Research Division of the U.S. Library of Congress, the authors follow the practise of the BGN by using "Persian Gulf" while acknowledging in the preface that the governments of Kuwait, Qatar, United Arab Emirates, Oman and Bahrain "officially reject the use of the term Persian Gulf—as do other Arab governments—and refer to that body of water as the Arabian Gulf".

Since about 1991, due to increased cooperation with Arab states of the Persian Gulf, various branches of the United States armed forces have issued directives to their members to use the "Arabian Gulf" when operating in the area to follow local conventions ("Persian Gulf" is still used in official publications and websites). The practice of the United States Fifth Fleet, based in Bahrain, is to use "Arabian Gulf":

It is commonly understood to be a friendly gesture of solidarity and support for our host nation of Bahrain and our other Gulf Cooperation Council partners in the region to use the term they prefer

— Spokesman for the United States Fifth Fleet,

In May 2025, during the 2025 Iran–United States negotiations and ahead of his visit to the Middle East that month, Donald Trump contemplated U.S. federal agencies using "Arabian Gulf" or "Gulf of Arabia" but abandoned the proposal due to opposition from Iran.

=== Atlases and other media ===
The National Geographic Society uses the name Persian Gulf to refer to this body of water. In 2004, the society published a new edition of its National Geographic Atlas of the World using the term "Arabian Gulf" as an alternative name (in smaller type and in parentheses) for "Persian Gulf". This resulted in heavy protests by many Iranians, especially the Internet user community and the Iranology Academy, which led to the Iranian government acting on the issue and banning the distribution of the society's publications in Iran. On 30 December 2004, the society reversed its decision and published an Atlas Update, removing the parenthetical reference and adding a note: "Historically and most commonly known as the Persian Gulf, this body of water is referred to by some as the Arabian Gulf." The June 2010 National Geographic Style Manual states: "The internationally accepted name is Persian Gulf, although Arab countries call the body of water the Arabian Gulf. Where scale permits, National Geographic maps include a map note about the Arabian Gulf. If Arabian Gulf is used in text, it should be explained."

The 2000 AP Stylebook elaborates: Persian Gulf is the "long-established name" and the best choice. "Some Arab nations call it the Arabian Gulf. Use Arabian Gulf only in direct quotations and explain in the text that the body of water is more commonly known as the Persian Gulf."

In 2004, the Persian Gulf-naming dispute was the subject of a Google bomb by an Iranian blogger named Pendar Yousefi. This was the combined efforts of hundreds of bloggers, webmasters and Persian forums who pointed links with the word Arabian Gulf to a spoof error page.

Some atlases and media outlets have taken to referring to "The Gulf" without any adjectival qualification. This usage is followed by the BBC and The Times Atlas of the World. Iran does not consider this an impartial usage and views it as an active contribution to abandonment of the historical name. In June 2006, Iran banned the sale of The Economist for the above reason, after a map in the magazine labeled the Persian Gulf as "The Gulf". The magazine repeated this act in its 18 February 2010 article titled "Iraq, Iran and the Politics of Oil: Crude Diplomacy". It also used the name "Arabian Gulf" in the same article.

Google had previously put both Persian Gulf and Arabian Gulf on its Google Maps. After May 2012, it removed both names from the body of water stating that it does not name every place in the world and that it did not want to take a political stance. Iranians complained about the change and started a Twitter campaign asking "Where's the Persian Gulf?". Since 2016, Google Maps has displayed both Persian Gulf and Arabian Gulf on the body of water and shows "either Arabian or Persian Gulf to local users, depending on geolocation and language settings." Google Earth shows both names, unless viewed through a server from a Gulf Coast Arab country, in which case it labels it simply "Arabian Gulf".

=== Sporting bodies ===
A planned second Islamic Solidarity Games in Iran, originally scheduled to take place in October 2009, and later rescheduled for April 2010, was canceled when the Arab World and Iran could not agree over the use of the term "Persian Gulf" in logos and medals for the Games.

In association football, the top tier of the Iranian football league system was named the Persian Gulf Cup in August 2006 to promote the Persian naming. The Iran national football team does not take part in the Arabian Gulf Cup for national teams surrounding the waters. The Arab Gulf Cup Football Federation was founded in 2016 for the competing nations of the Arabian Gulf Cup.

The top football league in the United Arab Emirates (UAE) was founded in 1973 as the UAE Football League. In 2007, the name was changed to UAE Pro-League. Starting from the 2013–14 season the name was changed to UAE Arabian Gulf League, as well as their League Cup and Super Cup competitions. The name change has been viewed as a revival of the Persian Gulf naming dispute with Iran accusing the United Arab Emirates of racism, and the Football Federation of the Islamic Republic of Iran barring the transfer of Javad Nekounam to a UAE club.

== Gallery ==
=== Persian Gulf or equivalent ===
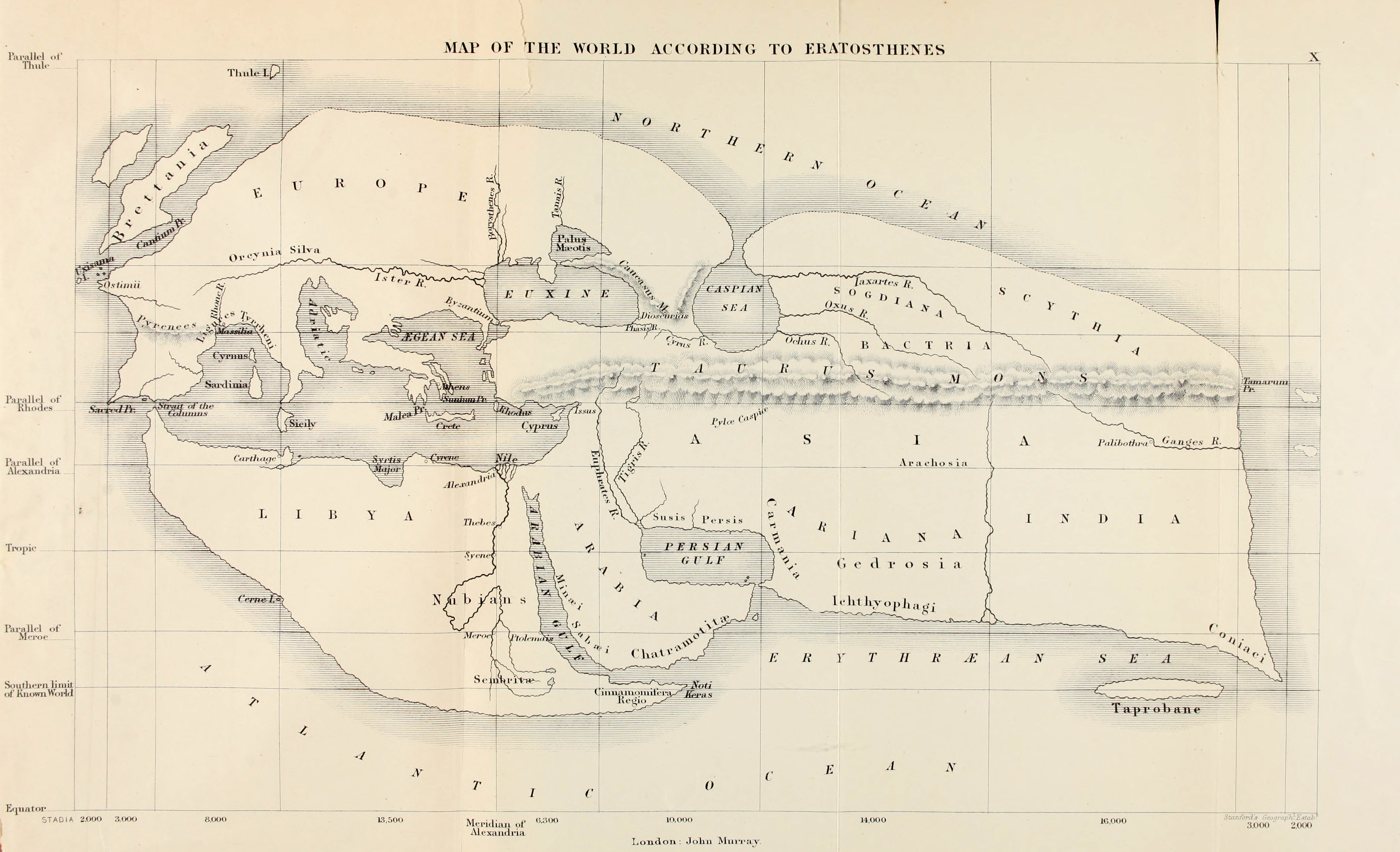
19th Century reconstruction of 194 BC Eratosthenes' map, Denoting Persian Gulf

An Early world map by Pomponius Mela 43 AD. Red Sea named Arabian Sea and Persian Gulf and Oman Sea named Persian Sea.

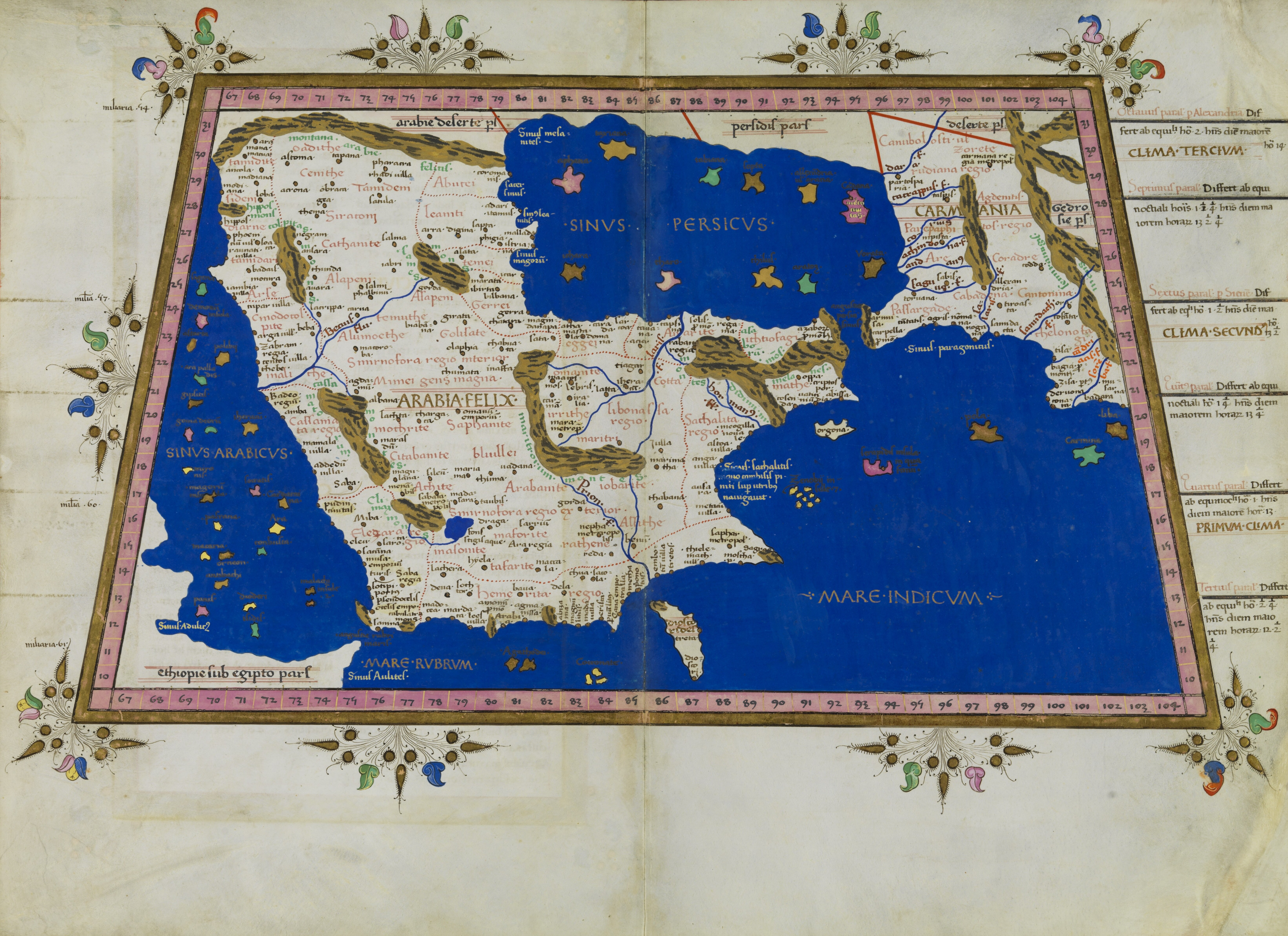
Map VI from Ptolemy's "Cosmographia" showing Sinus Persicus (Persian Gulf) and Sinus Arabicus (Red Sea), reconstruction from 1467

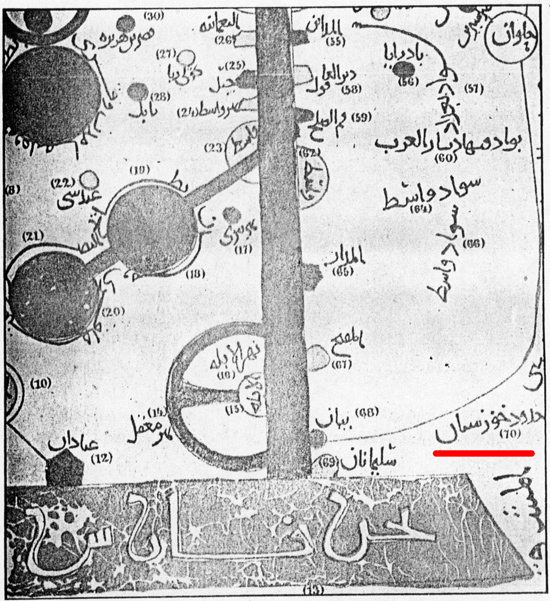
Regional map showing the word Bahr Fars, ("Persian Sea") in Arabic, from the 9th century text Al-aqalim by the Persian geographer Istakhri

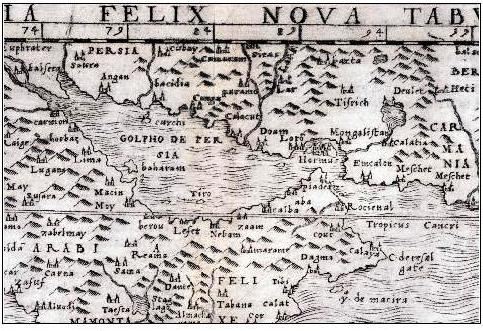
Giacomo Gastaldi's map c. 1548 is denoted by cartographic historian Gerald Tibbetts as the first "modern" map of the area, denoting Golpho de Persia.

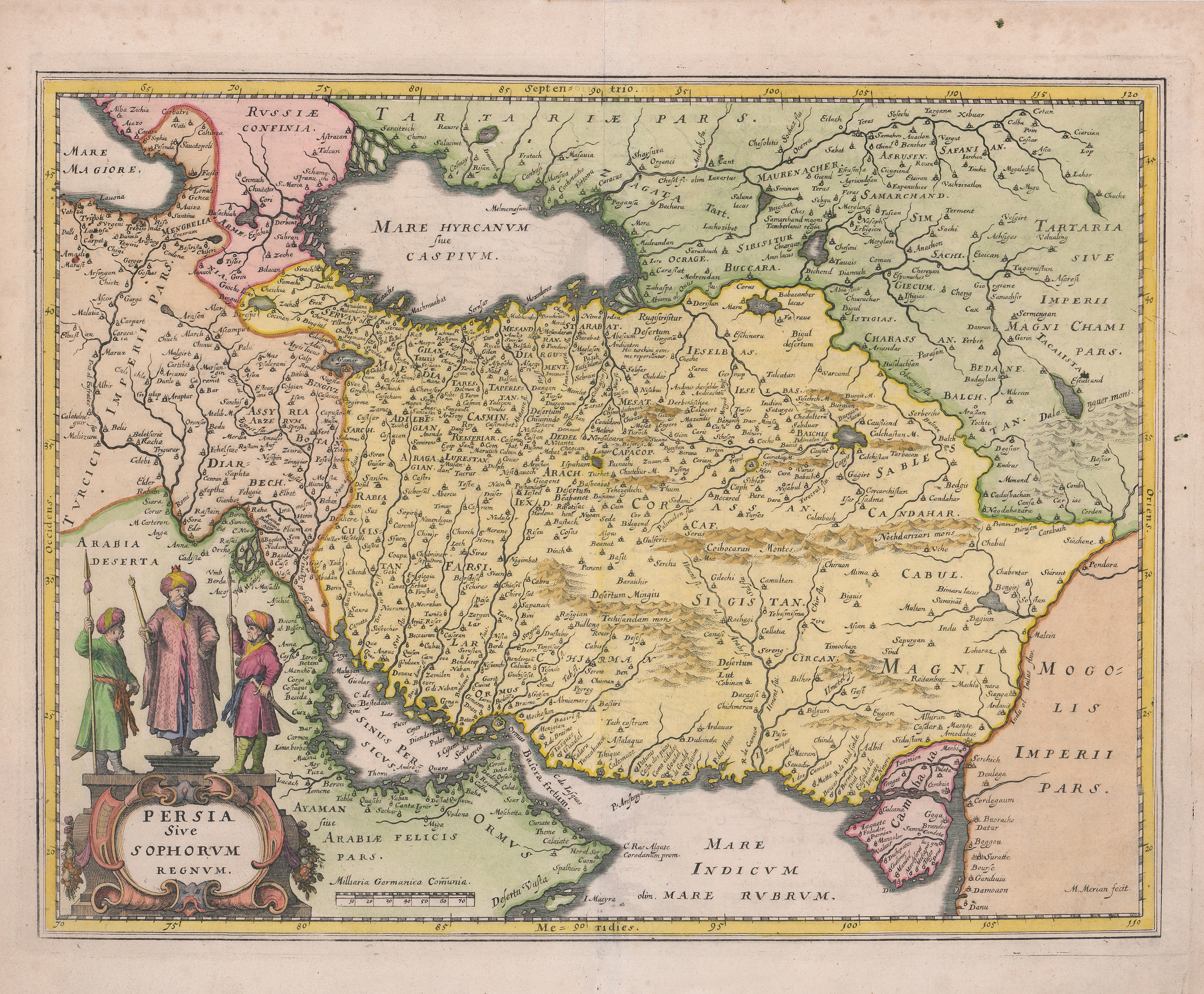
Persia Sive Sophorum regnum Old map Persia Merian 1638

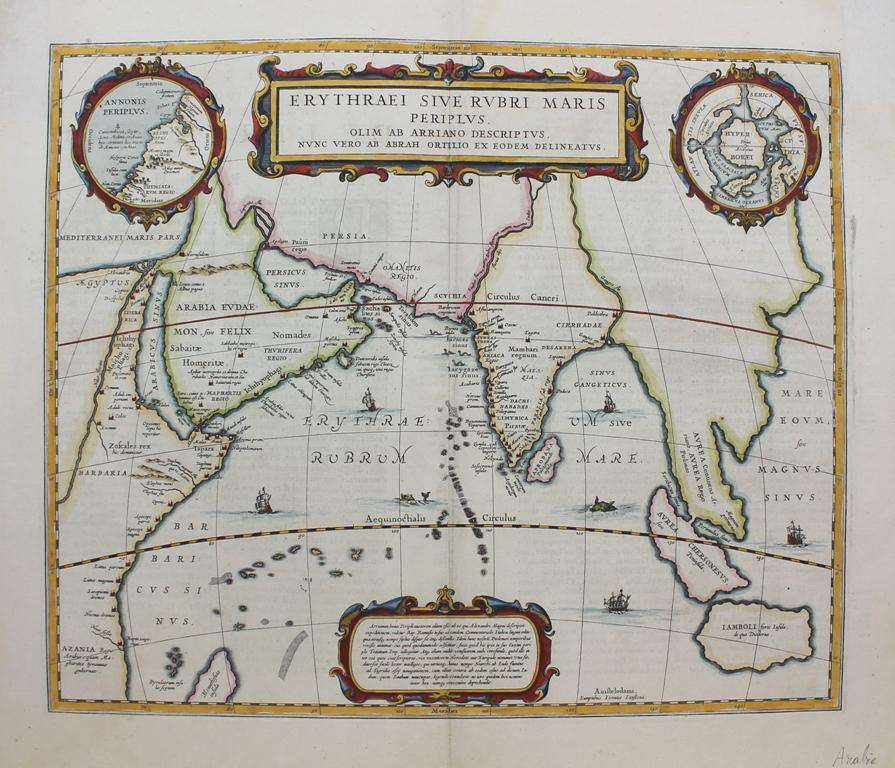
Location of Persian gulf and Arabian gulf by Joannes Janssonius, Amsterdam, 1640

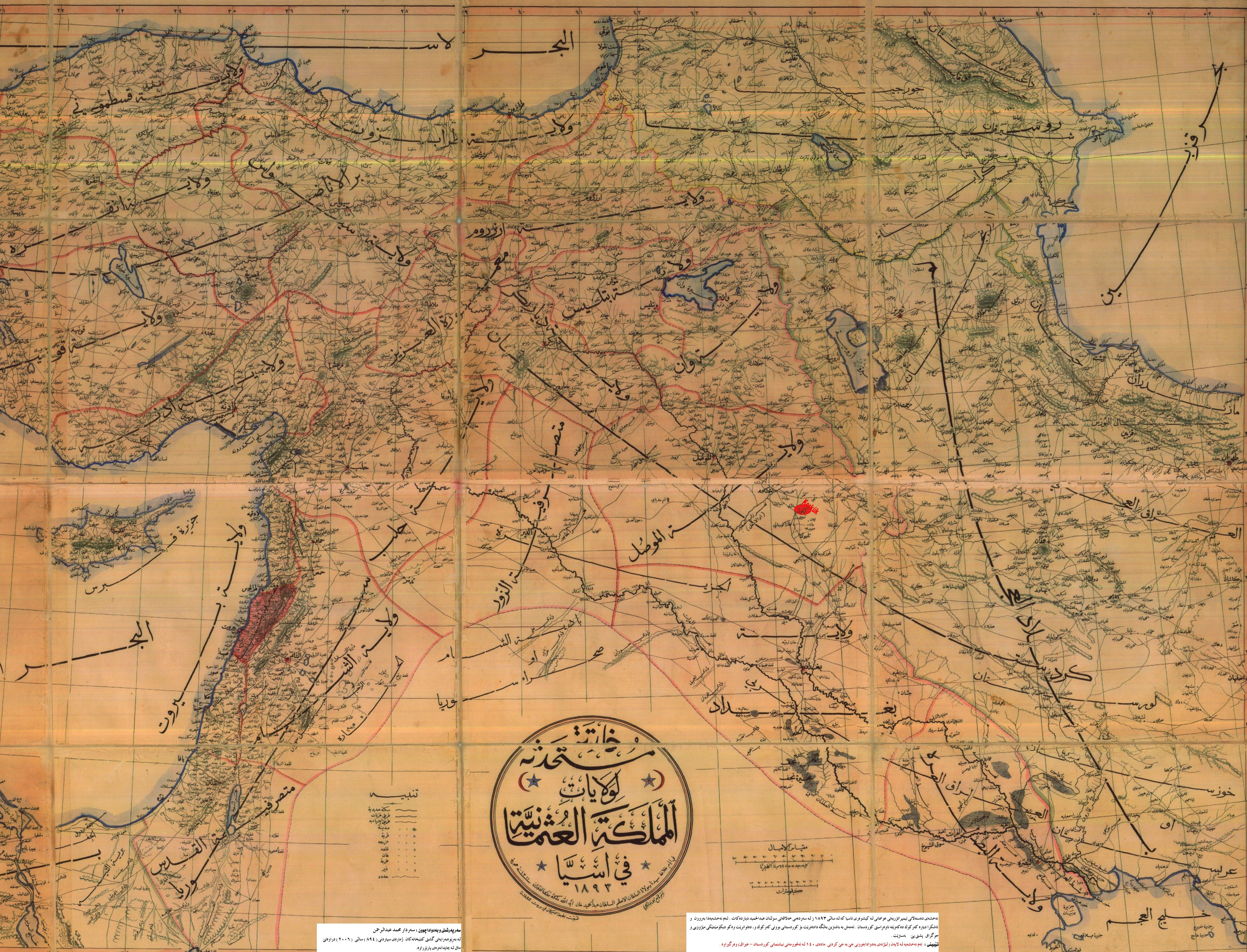
1893 Ottoman map calling it "Khaleej Al-Ajam"

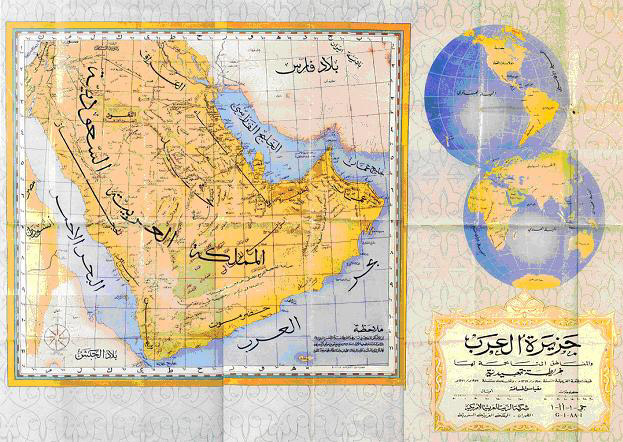
A Saudi ARAMCO map from 1952 using the term "Persian Gulf" (الخليج الفارسي).

=== Other names ===
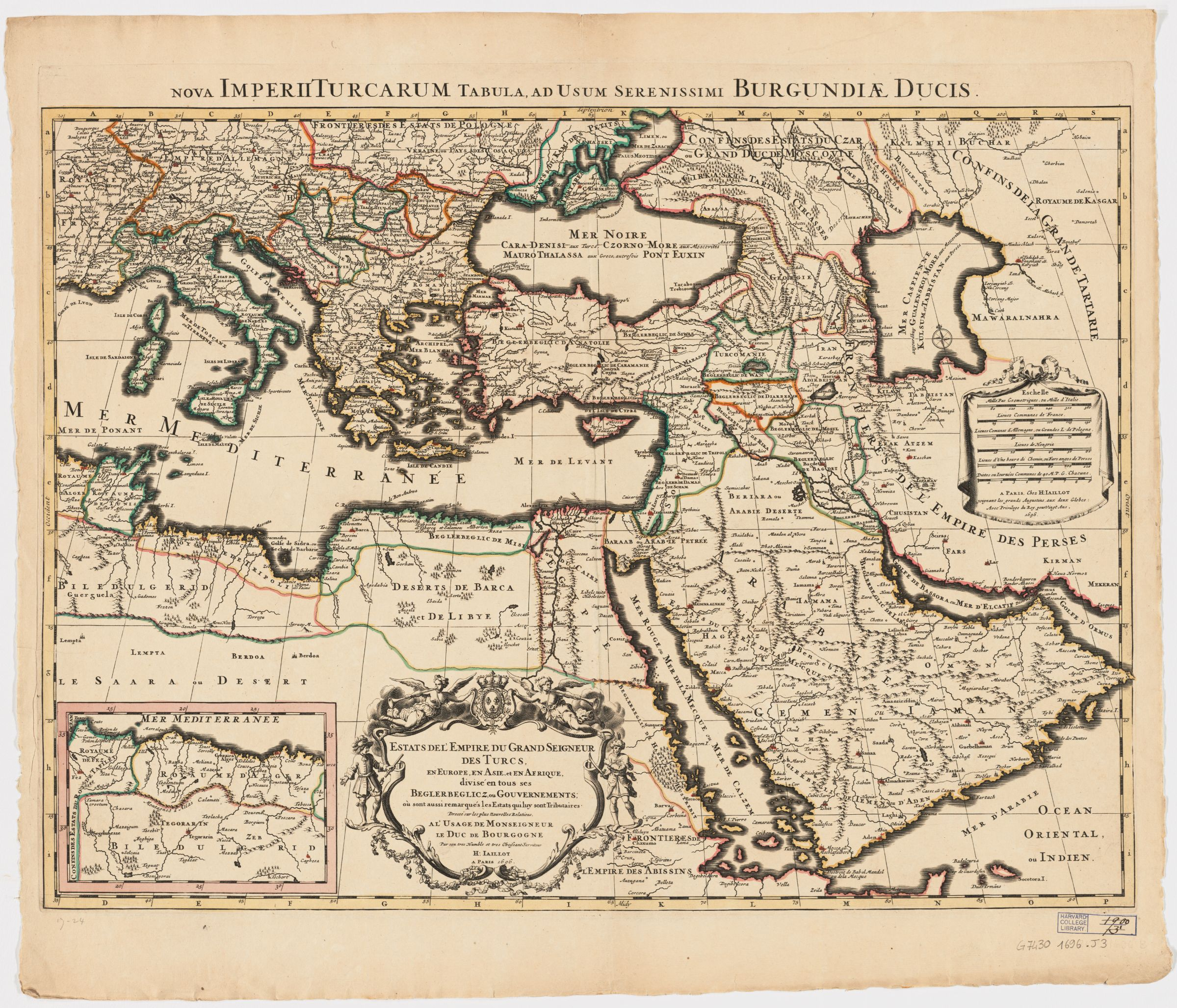
1600 map calling it "Gulf of Basra" or "Sea of Qatif"

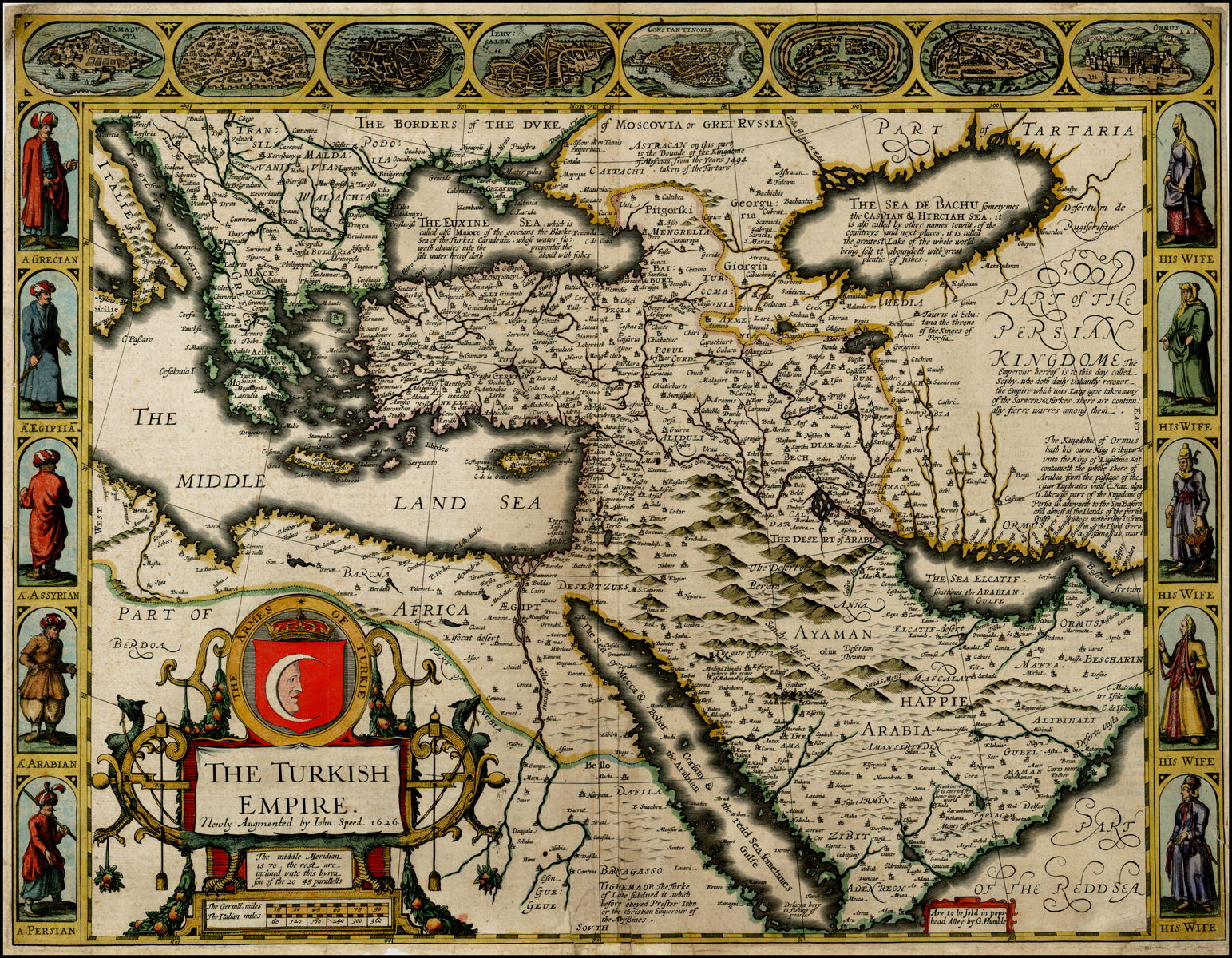
1626 map calling it "Sea of Qatif", or the Arabian Gulf. This map also names the Red Sea the Arabian Gulf.

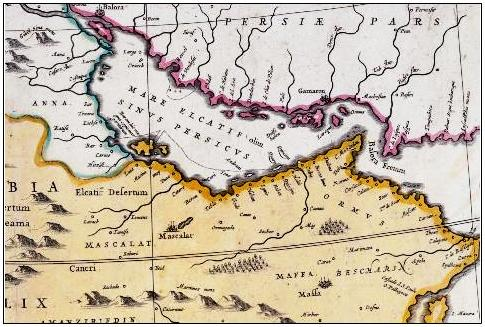
Jan Jansson's map, 17th century (MARE ELCATIF, formerly SINUS PERSICUS)

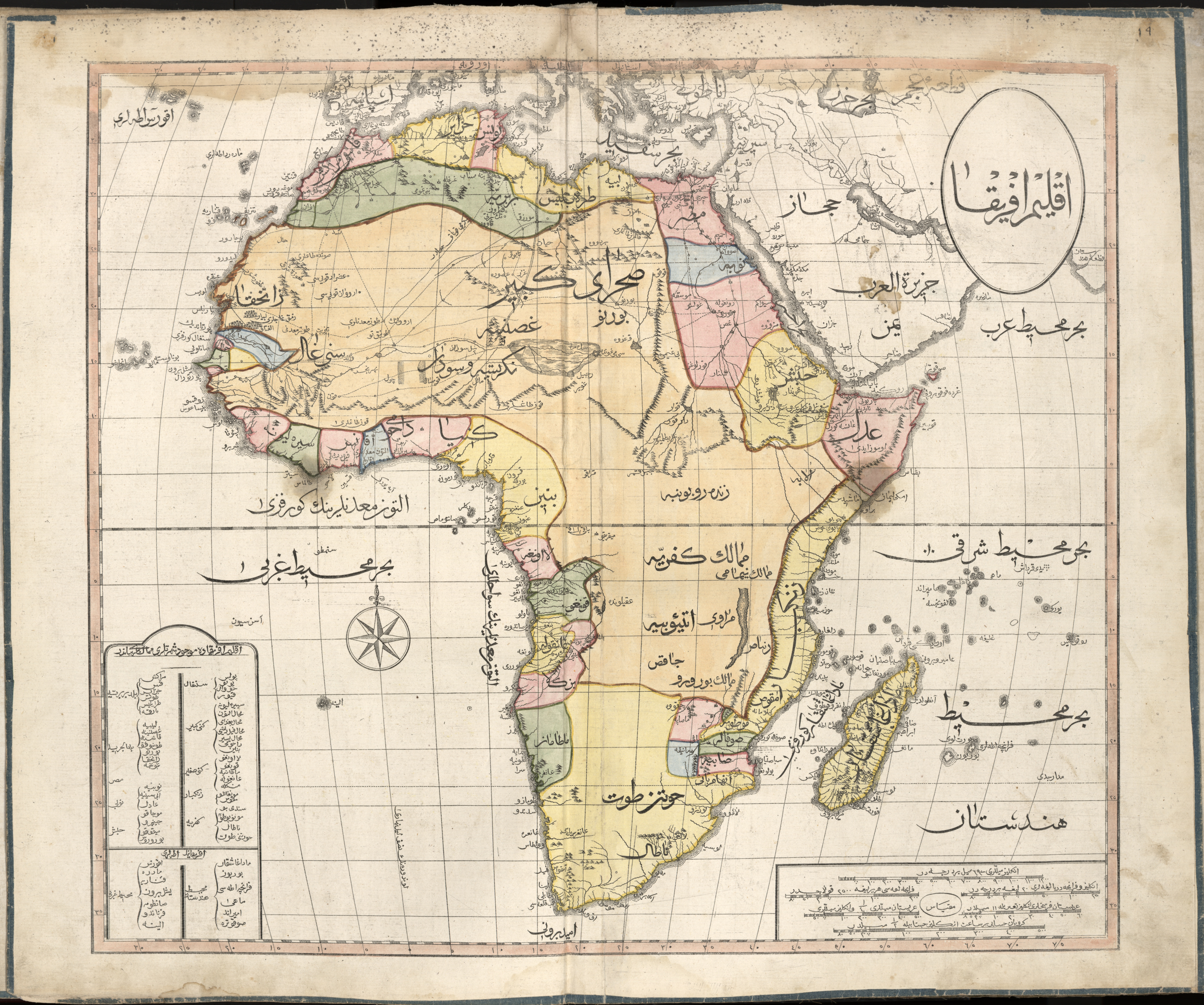
The Ottoman Cedid Atlas of 1803 calling it the Gulf of Basra

== See also ==
- Achaemenid inscription in the Kharg Island
- Gulf Cooperation Council
- Macedonia naming dispute
- Sea of Japan naming dispute
- Gulf of Mexico naming controversy
- Terminology section in the Gulf War article
- Territorial disputes in the Persian Gulf
