= KARG =

KARG may refer to:

- KARG (FM), an American Family Radio affiliate (91.7 FM) licensed to serve Poteau, Oklahoma, United States
- Walnut Ridge Regional Airport in Walnut Ridge, Arkansas, United States, which is assigned ICAO code KARG

== See also ==
- Karg (disambiguation)
