= Persian Gulf National Day =

Holiday in Iran

Persian Gulf National Day (Persian: روز ملی خلیج فارس) is an official holiday in Iran observed on the 10th day of Ordibehesht, the second month in the Iranian calendar. This usually coincides with either 29 or 30 April of the Gregorian calendar. The purpose of this holiday is to celebrate the history, name, and significance of the Persian Gulf. The holiday commemorates the day that combined forces of the Safavid Empire and the British East India Company captured Hormuz, expelling the Portuguese from the Strait of Hormuz.

== Background ==
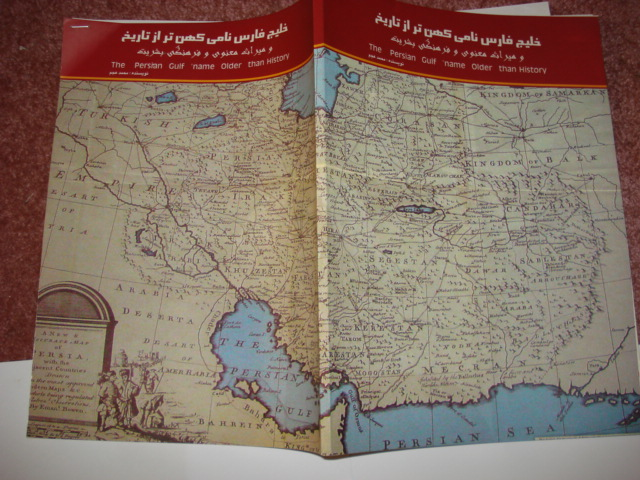
The book that proposed the Persian Gulf National Day 2003

The Persian Gulf, in West Asia, is an extension of the Indian Ocean located between Iran and the Arabian Peninsula. The Tehran Times notes that the term Persian Gulf and its translations have been used since earlier than 400 BC in many languages, and especially in the Arabic language. On almost all the maps printed before 1960 and in most modern international treaties, documents and plans, this water basin is known as the "Persian Gulf". The 10th day of Ordibehesht has been designated as the Persian Gulf National Day to commemorate the historic victory and also serves as a reminder of the real name of the Persian Gulf.

The establishment of National Persian Gulf Day was a response to the movement among pan-Arabists to rename the Persian Gulf the Arabian Gulf. The Arab League officially recognized the name Arabian Gulf in 1964, but most international bodies, including the United Nations and International Hydrographic Organization use the term Persian Gulf. Arab states of the Persian Gulf largely use the term Arabian Gulf. The United States uses the term Persian Gulf, though the practice of the United States Fifth Fleet, based in Bahrain, is to use the preferred term of the host nation.

Iran established Persian Gulf National Day in 2005. The day is marked with various ceremonies in Iran, especially in the coastal cities of the Persian Gulf.

The date commemorates the Anglo-Persian capture of Hormuz in 1622 which drove Portuguese colonial forces out of the Strait of Hormuz. The Postal Service of the Islamic Republic of Iran, has issued a series of stamps commemorating "the national day of Persian Gulf".

== Anglo-Persian conquest of Hormuz ==
Names, routes and locations of the Periplus of the Erythraean Sea.

In the Persian–Portuguese war, Safavid Iran and the British East India Company challenged Portugal and the Kingdom of Hormuz for supremacy in the Persian Gulf. In 1602, the Safavid army under the command of Imam-Quli Khan expelled the Portuguese from Bahrain. In 1612, the Portuguese Empire took the city of Gamrūn and transliterated the name to Comorão. Almost two years later (in 1615), Comorão was taken by 'Abbās the Great after a naval battle with the Portuguese and renamed Bandar-e' Abbās, or "Port of 'Abbās".

In 1622, with the help of four English ships, the Persians under Shah Abbas took Hormuz from the Portuguese in the Anglo-Persian capture of Hormuz.

== Registration as a day of National Heritage ==
In 2010, traditional naval documentation of the Persian Gulf was registered on Iran's National Heritage List. The decision was made by the Ministry of Cultural Heritage, Tourism and Handicraft Organization and presided over by former vice President Esfandiar Rahim Mashaei, to register the day as a day of national heritage. The campaign launched by individual Arab states to rename the Persian Gulf was what drove this decision. The Iranian postal authority has issued a series of stamps commemorating the day. In October 2018, the WIPO, the intellectual property agency of the UN, certified Persian Gulf Pearl based on the Lisbon Agreement. According to the agreement, based on international law, no country, government, or organization can use another name to refer to the Persian Gulf Pearl brand.

== See also ==
- Territorial disputes in the Persian Gulf
- Name of Iran
- Early world maps
- History of cartography
