= Karg (surname) =

Karg is a surname. Notable people with the surname include:

- Christiane Karg (born 1980), German operatic soprano
- Diego Karg (born 1990), Dutch footballer
- Gabriel Karg (c. 1570–between 1630 and 1640), Swabian artist
- Morné Karg (born 1977), Namibian cricketer
- Sigfrid Karg-Elert (1877–1933), German composer
