= Karg, Battagram =

Coordinates: 34°46′N 72°56′E

Karg
- Village Council
- Interactive map of Karg
- Country: Pakistan
- Region: Khyber-Pakhtunkhwa
- District: Battagram District
- Time zone: UTC+5 (PST)

Karg is a Village Council in Battagram District of Khyber-Pakhtunkhwa.
