= Kharg Island =

Iranian island in Persian Gulf

Native name: جزیره خارگ (Arabic)
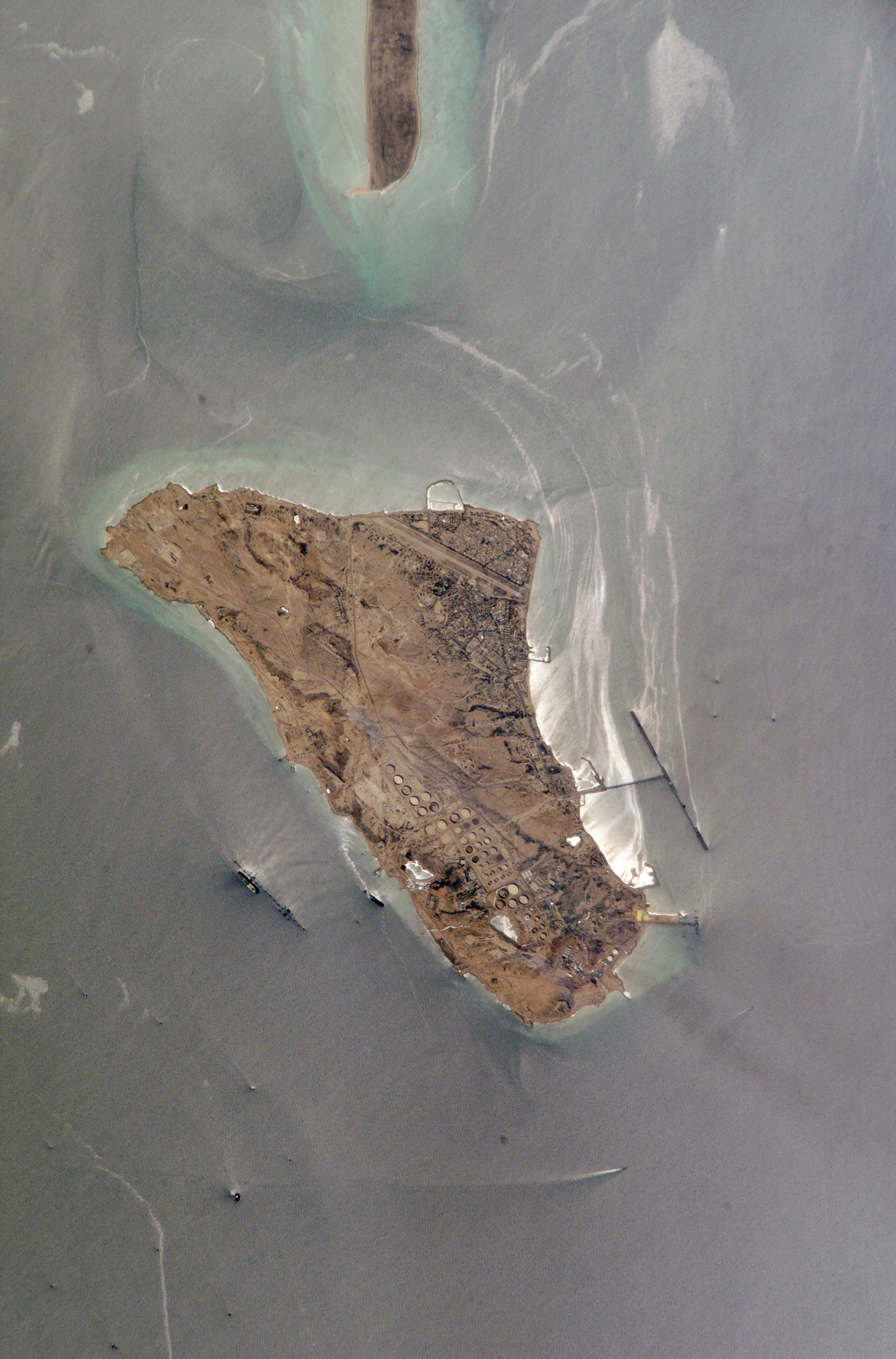
- A 2010 satellite image of Kharg Island

- Location within Iran Location within Persian Gulf
- Interactive map of Kharg Island

Geography
- Location: Persian Gulf
- Coordinates: 29°14′42″N 50°18′36″E
- Area: 20 km^{2} (7.7 sq mi)
- Highest elevation: 70 m (230 ft)
- Highest point: Kūh-e Dīdeh Bānī

Administration
- Iran
- Province: Bushehr
- County: Bushehr
- District: Kharg
- Largest settlement: Kharg (pop. 8,193)

Demographics
- Population: 8,193 (2016)
- Pop. density: 410/km^{2} (1060/sq mi)
- Languages: Persian (majority); Khargi (minority)

Additional information
- Time zone: IRST (UTC+3:30)

Kharg Island (Persian: جزیره خارگ, Persian pronunciation: [xɒːrɡ]), also spelled Khark Island and often referred to as the "Forbidden Island", is a continental island of Iran in the Persian Gulf. The island is 25 kilometres (16 mi) off the coast of Iran and 660 kilometres (410 mi) northwest of the Strait of Hormuz. Administered by the adjacent coastal Bushehr Province, Kharg Island provides a sea port for the export of up to 90% of Iran's oil products, as well as supplying storage for up to 30 million barrels (5 million cubic metres) of oil.

The island lies close to several offshore oil fields, including the Faridun, Darius, Cyrus, and Ardašir fields. The city of Kharg and the Jazireh-ye Khark Lighthouse are located on the island, which has its own freshwater supply. Before it developed into a major oil terminal in the 1960s, Iranian writer Jalal Al-e-Ahmad famously called the island "The Orphan Pearl of the Persian Gulf.”

The island contains several important archaeological sites, including ruins of a Christian monastery dating from possibly as far back as the 7th century. There are also tombs, temples, and the Achaemenid inscription of cuneiform writing dating from between 550 and 330 BCE. It has been an important trading post for centuries, controlled by the Portuguese Empire from the 16th to the 17th century and by the Dutch colonial empire in the 18th century. The first depictions of the island appear on 16th-century Portuguese maps by Fernão Vaz Dourado, Lopo Homem and Diogo Homem.

It was first developed into an oil terminal in the 1960s under Mohammad Reza Pahlavi, in partnership with American oil company Amoco. Military installations on the island were bombed by the United States during the Iran war in March and April 2026.

== Name ==
The island's name has changed through the years, with both local dialects and European maps influencing its spelling: it has been recorded as Kharg, Khark, Kharaj, and Kharej.

== Geography and governance ==
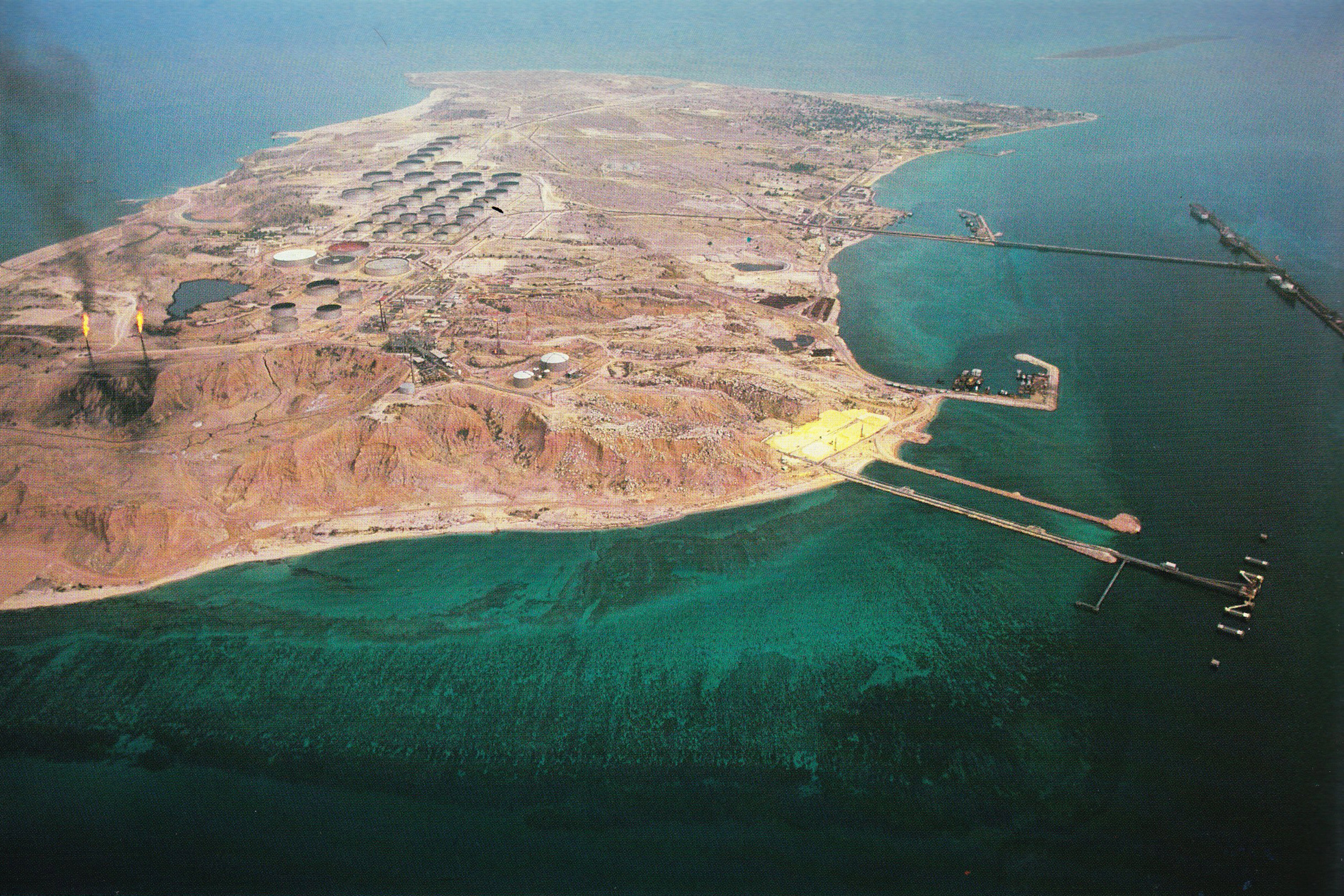
Kharg Island, 1973

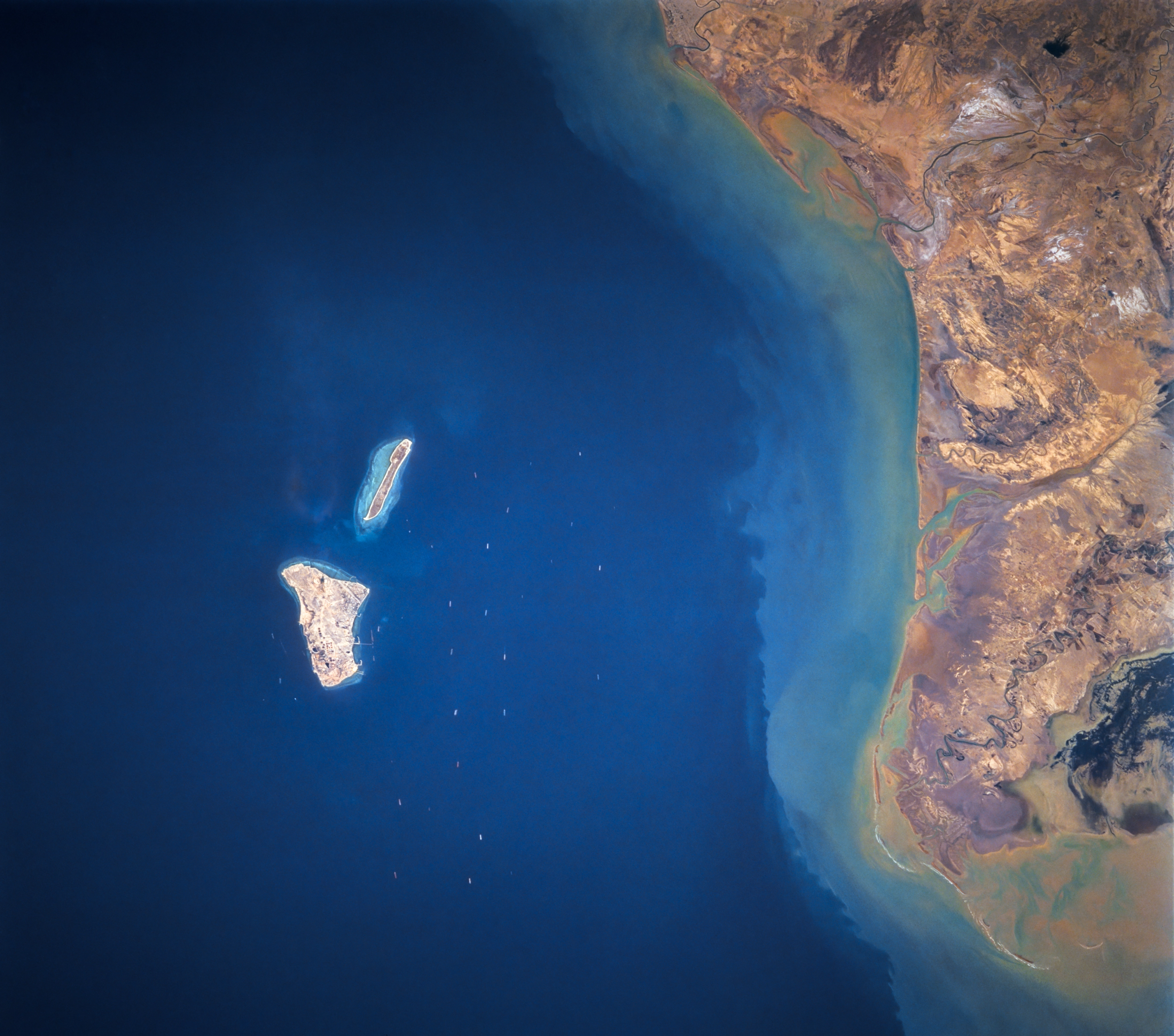
Kharg Island in 1993

Kharg Island is a coral outcrop in the Persian Gulf located around 25–28 km (16–17 mi) off the coast of Iran and around 55 km (34 mi) northwest of the port of Bushehr, 660 km (410 mi) northwest of the Strait of Hormuz. It is around 8 kilometres (5 mi) long and 4–5 kilometres (2.5–3 mi) wide.

The waters around it are deep, and it is one of the few islands in the Persian Gulf that has its own supply of fresh water. Nearby offshore oil fields include the Faridun, Darius, Cyrus, and Ardašir fields, from which underwater pipelines run to Kharg.

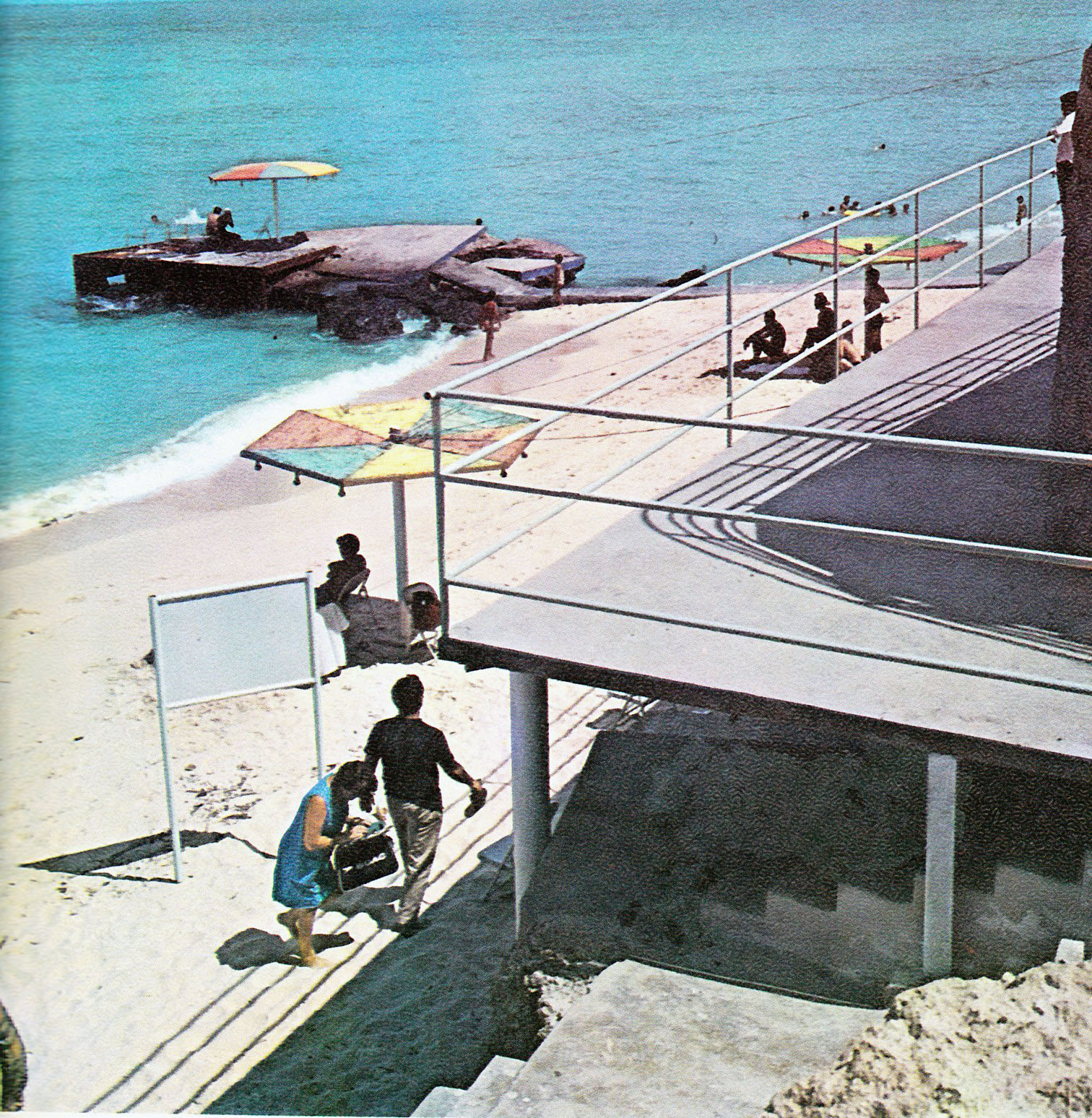
National Iranian Oil Company employees' beach in Kharg, 1970

The city of Kharg, the only city in the Kharg District, is located on the island. The island is administered by the adjacent coastal Bushehr province. Access is restricted, and the island is guarded by the Iran's Islamic Revolutionary Guard Corps (IRGC), leading to its name "Forbidden Island.”

Since the 2010s, the government has been investigating its tourism potential, and in 2026 a special class of visitor permit was introduced. According to the Iranian Ministry of Tourism and Cultural Heritage, from 2026, tourists could obtain a special permit from the government upon application, which would include detailed documentation of the intended visit, and visitors would need to be accompanied by an approved guide at all times.

== History ==
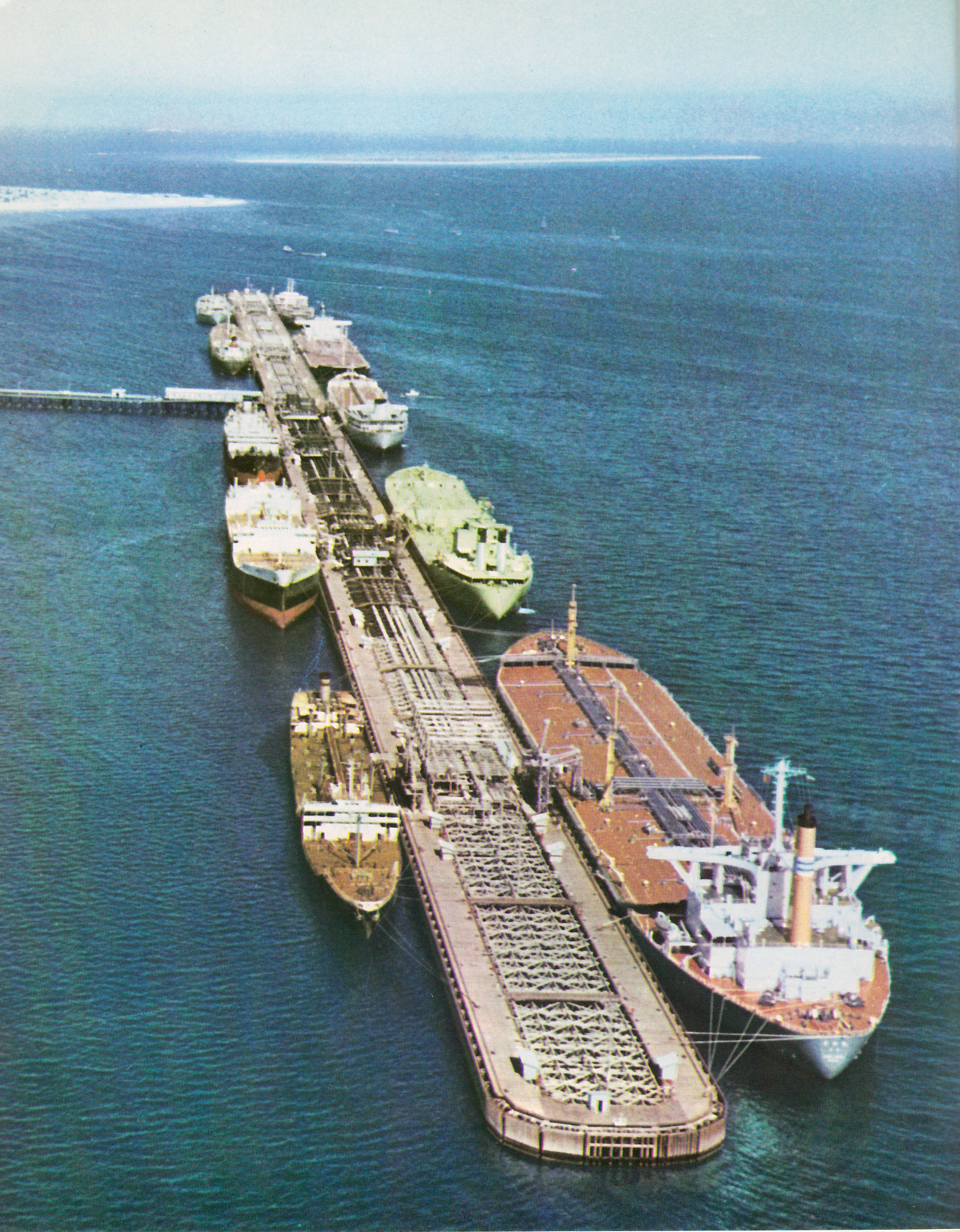
Kharg oil terminal, 1967

=== Middle Ages ===
Kharg is mentioned in the Hudud al-'Alam as a good source for pearls around 982 CE. It was regarded as part of the district of Ardašir-ḵorra by Abu Esḥāq Eṣṭaḵri, and served as a key stopover point for trading ships sailing between India and the southern port of Basra. In 1218, geographer and bibliographer Šehāb-al-Din Abu ʿAbd-Allāh Yāqut visited the island. Alongside pearling and trade, Kharg's economy was based on fruit and date palm cultivation.

=== Early modern era ===
During the colonial expansion of European powers, the Portuguese were the first to claim the island, along with other islands in the Persian Gulf, under the command of Afonso de Albuquerque and Tristão da Cunha in 1507. The Portuguese used the Strait of Hormuz as a trading, vassal outpost state until 1622. They built the fortress known as the Portuguese Castle to ensure military control of the strait against the Persians and other European powers with interests in Asia.

In 1645, Dutch sailors on a passing fleet named the island "Delft” after the seat of one of the Dutch East India Company offices. In 1665, Kharg was visited by French traveller Jean de Thévenot, who recorded trade at the time with Isfahan and Basra.

In the 18th century, Kharg retained a reputation as the place to engage the best pilots for ships sailing to Basra. In 1751, the island was raided by Ḥuwala Arabs. In 1753, Dutch East India Company agent Baron Tiddo Frederik van Kniphausen paid 2,000 rupees to Mir Nasáir, the Arab ruler of the city of Bandar Rig, to secure perpetual ownership of the island, and he turned the island into a free port, open to all nationalities. Kniphausen built houses in the northeast corner of the island. As part of the Dutch colonial empire, the Dutch established both a trading post and Fort Mosselstein. The Dutch East India Company used it as a trading station.

In 1757, a church was constructed, and a Carmelite priest ministered to the largest Catholic community in Persia; the Bishop of Isfahan moved from Isfahan to Kharg. In January 1766, following worsening relations between the Dutch and local peoples, Mir Muhanna, governor of Bandar Rig, seized the fortress and forced the Dutch out for good.

In 1837, the island was briefly occupied by the British to block the Siege of Herat but was soon returned to its previous owners. The Persians abandoned it before the 1856 Anglo-Persian War, and British forces occupied it in December 1856. Around 1900, the population of the island was subject to the ruler of the Hayat-Dawudi people, based at Bandar Rig.

=== 20th century ===
Reza Shah Pahlavi repurposed Kharg as a place of exile for political opponents, which prevented any broader development.

In 1956, work began to build oil reservoirs on Kharg to hold oil piped from the Gachsaran oil field. In 1959, a 159-kilometre (99 mi) long 660–710–760 millimetres (26–28–30 in) pipeline was completed; the terminal allowed loading of 100,000 dwt tankers and was inaugurated on 8 November 1960.

In 1964, a 27-mile 30-inch submarine loop was completed from Bandar Ganaveh and with additional pumping engines along the onshore portion, the capacity of the line was increased from 330,000 to 500,000bpd. In 1965, a 106-mile 42-inch line was completed from the Aghajari oil field to Ganaveh and two additional 27-mile 30-inch submarine loops were laid. At this point, Kharg was considered the largest oil shipment terminal in the world.

Upon visiting the island in 1960, Iranian writer Jalal Al-e-Ahmad called it "the orphan pearl of the Persian Gulf.” During the 1960s, Iran entered into negotiations with Saudi Arabia over the territorial extent of the two countries on the continental shelf in the gulf. They agreed on a modified equidistant line, which allowed Kharg to fall under Iranian jurisdiction.

In 1969, under the Shah, the island was developed into an oil terminal in a partnership between the National Iranian Oil Company and the US company Amoco. By around 1975, there were three major oil terminals on the island – Kharg Terminal and its long T-shaped jetty on the east coast, Sea Island Terminal off the west coast, and Darius Terminal in the south – and the Kharg Chemical Complex or Khemco Terminal, a gas terminal. Kharg Island became the world's largest offshore crude oil terminal and the principal sea terminal for Iranian oil.

==== Iranian Revolution ====
In 1979, Amoco's property was expropriated by the National Iranian Oil Company after the Iranian Revolution. Despite ongoing sanctions since the revolution, Iran has continued to build facilities on the island, to develop self-reliance and avoid having to send oil through other countries.

The island was bombed during the Iran–Iraq War of the 1980s, with the facilities put out of commission by heavy bombing by the Iraqi Air Force between 1982 and 1986. Repairs were very slow after the war, but when constructed the facilities were expanded and improved. In 1990, the Iranian Government agreed to pay Amoco $600m in compensation: $540 million for the takeover of four gulf drilling fields and the Kharg oil terminal, and $60 million for the petrochemical processing plant on the island.

=== 21st century ===
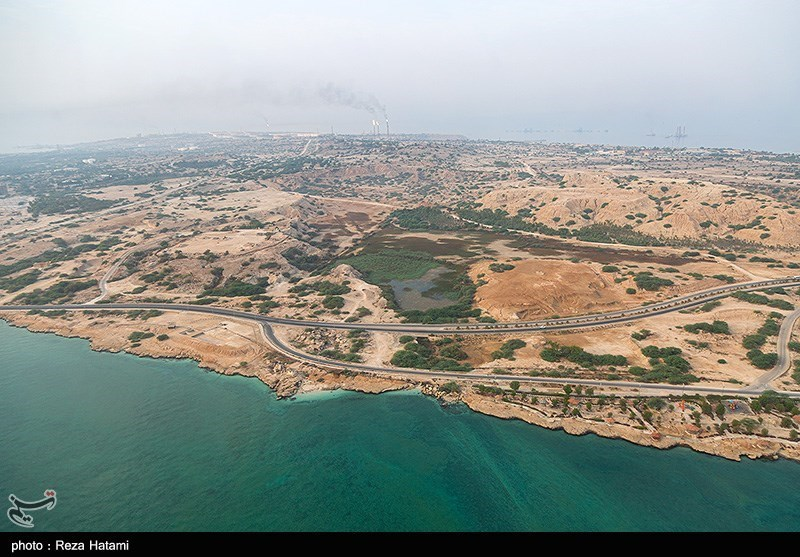
Kharg Island in 2022

In 2009, Iran exported and swapped 950 million bbl (151 million m^{3}) of crude oil via the southern Kharg oil terminal. In 2015, the terminal facilities on the island were operated by the National Iranian Oil Company.

==== Iran war ====
U.S. strikes on Kharg Island, 13 March 2026

In 2025 and early 2026, Iran, through Kharg, exported around 1.5 million barrels of oil per day to China. Other Iran ports, and other customer countries, show much smaller numbers. During 15 to 20 February, Iran increased its oil export to 3 times normal rate, and reduced oil storage. Following the start of the 2026 Iran war on 28 February 2026, satellite imagery revealed that Iran had begun reducing oil storage there since early February, probably in anticipation of an attack. The facility had 18 million barrels (58% full), when nine of the oil tanks were estimated to be full by 7 March, compared to 27 in mid-January.

In March 2026, it was reported that Israel was considering bombing the island, while the US was favoring seizing it. On 13 March, the US bombed military installations on the island. Around 90 military targets were struck, while oil infrastructure on the island was left intact. On March 20, 2026, the US news website Axios reported that Trump was considering blockading or occupying the island in an effort to force Iran to allow ships to pass through the Strait of Hormuz.

On April 7, 2026, the US military struck military targets on Kharg Island. On July 14, 2026, President Trump held a meeting at the Situation Room to discuss military operations against Iran, including a possible invasion of Kharg Island.

== Archaeology ==
Kharg Island archaeological site
- Periods: Achaemenid, Selucid, Parthian, Nabataean
- Location: 25 km (16 mi) off the coast of Iran

Site notes
- Archaeologists: F. Sarre, E. Herzfeld, Father Marie-Joseph Stève
- Condition: Ruins
- Public access: Yes

=== Achaemenid inscription ===
In November 2007, an Achaemenid-era (550–330 BCE) cuneiform inscription in Old Persian was discovered on Kharg Island. The inscription is carved on a coral rock in Old Persian semi-syllabic cuneiform signs. Despite the usually well-ordered regular system of Achaemenid inscriptions, this one is in an unusual order, written in five lines. It is estimated to be around 2,400 years old. The inscription has been variously translated to mean something like "[This] land was wilderness and without water [and] I brought happiness and welfare to it", or "The not irrigated land was happy [with] me bringing out [water]".

Linguist Habib Borjian explains that if the inscription is authentic, combined with the island's known history of qanat usage, (Note: The 17th-century French traveller Jean de Thévenot noted the presence of qanats (ancient irrigation systems) on the island.) which developed under the Achaemenid rule, it can be suggested that there was a Persian colonisation of Kharg under the Achaemenids. The Iranian dialect of the Persian settlers of the Achaemenid era may have been the ancestor of the Khargi language, with Borjian adding that "there is no contradicting evidence to make this hypothesis implausible".

The inscription became a contentious matter in the Persian Gulf naming dispute. Some experts said it was further evidence confirming the Persian name for the Persian Gulf. This led to a "media frenzy" in surrounding Arab countries, where efforts were made to disprove its authenticity. In May 2008, the inscription was seriously damaged by unknown vandal(s) after they climbed a fence to enter the area and inflicted damage deliberately with a sharp object. According to Khark Deputy Governor Ali Jazebi, about 70% of the inscription was seriously damaged. Another source said that around 10–15% was damaged.

=== Monastery ===
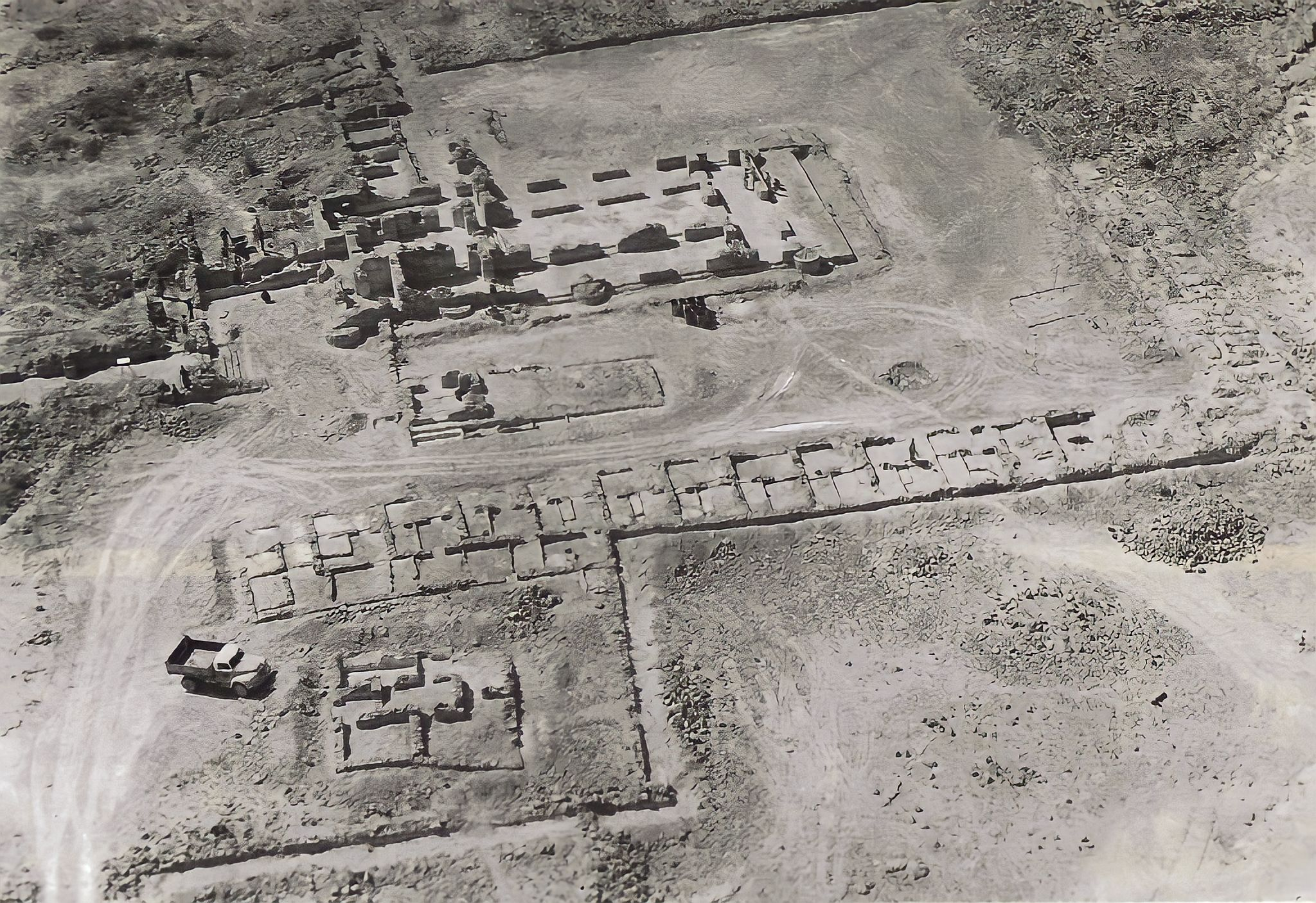
Remains of the monastery (fa) on Kharg Island

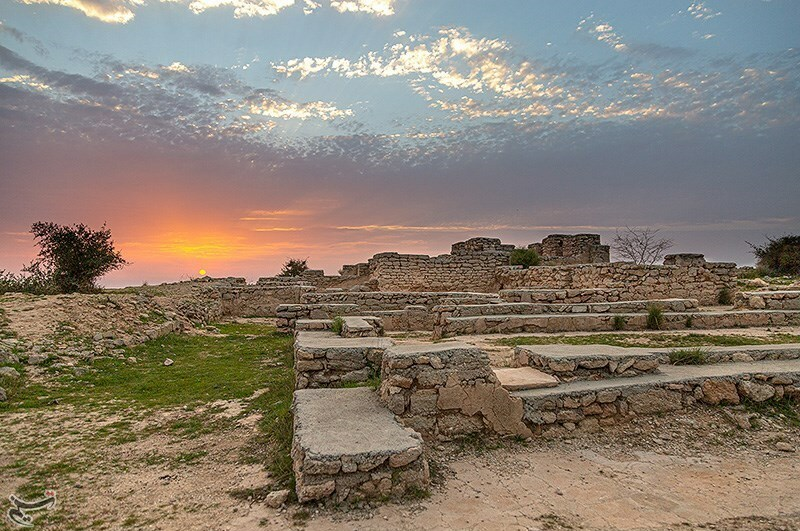
The oldest Christian ruins in Iran are located on the island of Kharg

There is a ruined Christian church complex or ancient monastery, Kharg Monastery, of some 96 m (315 ft) by 85 m (279 ft), featuring a chapel, 19 monks cells, library and courtyard. American historian and archeologist Daniel T. Potts calls it, "[T]he most important complex of antiquities on Kharg... [it] is the largest single document of Christian archaeology in the Persian Gulf region." Theories have been offered as to its origins: Potts says "the ceramic evidence suggests a date in the 8th and 9th centuries. [Marie-Joseph] Stève has suggested the complex may have been founded as early as the 7th century.”

=== Other notable archaeological sites ===
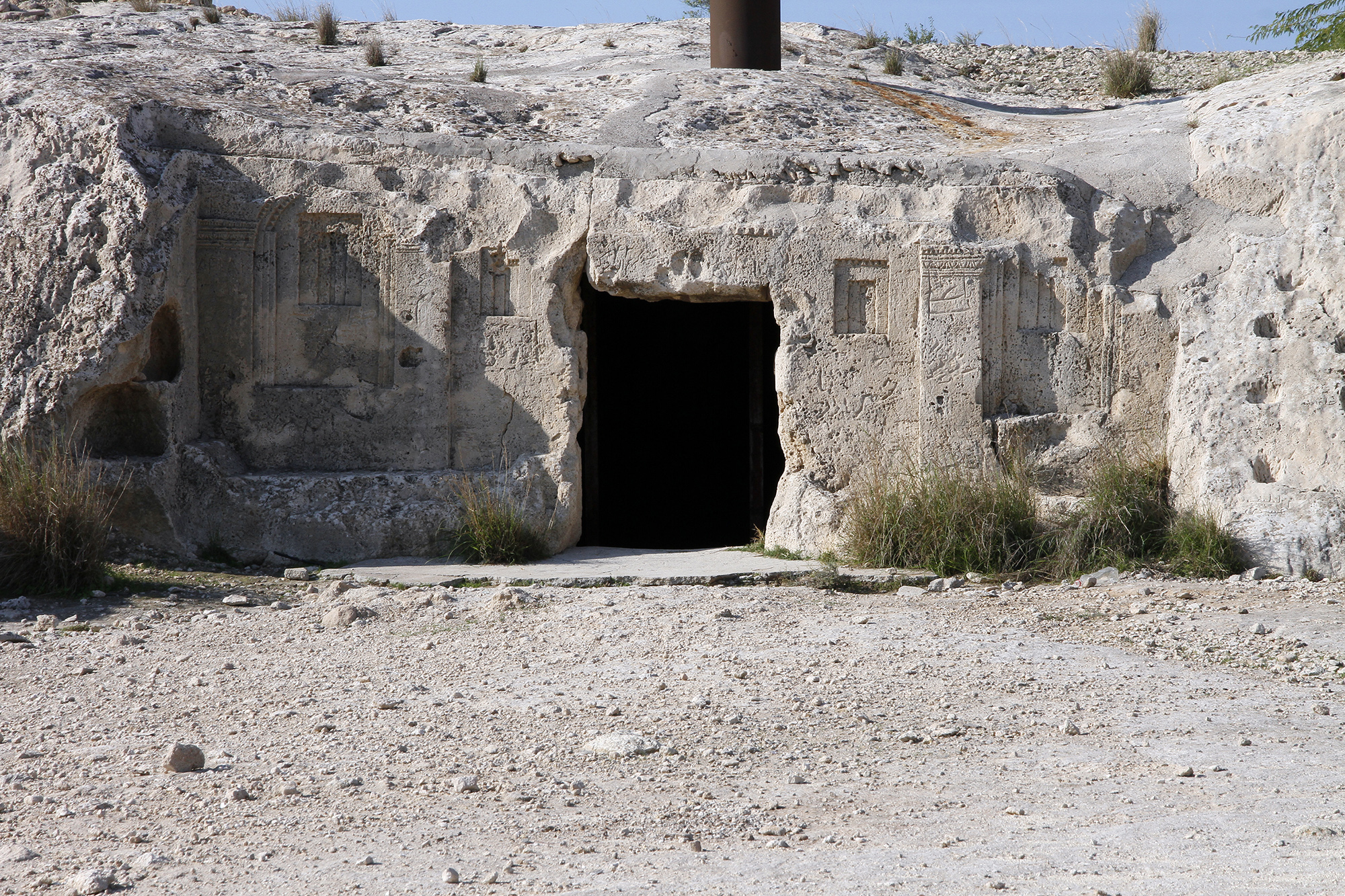
An entrance to the Kharg tombs

The first archaeological evidence of human occupation on Kharg Island was reported by Captain A. W. Stiffe in 1898, with studies of his discoveries published by Friedrich Sarre and Ernst Herzfeld in 1910. They discovered two rock-cut chambered tombs, known as the Eastern and Southern Tombs, which are probably the earliest recorded remains. They feature arched entranceways to a main chamber with a vestibule, from which spawned around twenty smaller chambers. The southern tomb is 13 m (43 ft) deep and features a relief of a reclining man drinking, in the Seleucid and Parthian styles of Palmyra. A damaged relief suggested to feature Nike is on the face of a sphere-topped column. Stève has argued that the architecture of the tombs is more reminiscent of Nabataean architecture at Petra than anything Palmyrene.

Another 83 rock-cut tombs and 62 megalithic tombs have been studied. The rock-cut tombs fall into four categories: single-chambered tombs, shallow tombs of varying shapes, pit burials, and excavated multi-chambered complexes. The 62 tombs, excavated by Father Marie-Joseph Stève, date from the Abbasid Caliphate, and may have been a Jewish cemetery. There are also Zoroastrian burial sites, Christian graves, and Sassanid-era tombs. Stève also noticed the presence of several Nestorian style crosses at some of the tombs. Also on the island are the Mir Mohammad Shrine, built in the late 13th century, and the Mir Aram Shrine, with torches believed to date back to the Achaemenid era.

There are also ruins of a coarse stone temple measuring around 7.5 m (25 ft) square with a plastered altar for fire in the centre, as documented by Stève.

== Facilities and significance ==
Kharg Island provides a seaport for the export of oil from the offshore oilfields of Aboozar, Forouzan, and Dorood, and the Ahvaz, Marun, and Gachsaran oil fields. Its surrounding deep waters mean that long jetties can provide mooring for tankers, unlike much of the rest of Iran's coastline, which is sloping and shallower. Up to 90% of Iran's oil exports, which include crude oil, fertilisers, liquefied gas, and other products, pass through the Kharg terminal, which can load 10 supertankers at once. This makes it very strategically significant. There is enough storage for around 30 million bbl (5 million m^{3}) of oil on the island.

The island is served by Kharg Airport. The Jazireh-ye Khark Lighthouse serves the island. (Note: "Jazireh-ye" means "the island of".)

In the 2016 Iranian census, there were 8,193 people recorded in Kharg District, which is coextensive with the island.

Jazireh-ye Khark Lighthouse
- Location: Kharg Island, Iran
- Coordinates: 29°12′51″N 50°19′10″E

Tower
- Foundation: concrete base
- Construction: aluminium skeletal tower
- Height: 14 m (46 ft)
- Shape: square pyramidal tower with central cylinder and lantern

Light
- Focal height: 90 m (300 ft)
- Range: 17 nmi (31 km; 20 mi)
- Characteristic: Fl(2) W 12s

== In popular culture ==
The island appears with a SAM radar installation on it in the Sega Genesis flight simulator F-15 Strike Eagle II in the Persian Gulf mission map along with F-19 Stealth Fighter. The island is featured as a playable map in DICE's Battlefield 3 video game.

It also appears in Delta Force: Black Hawk Down – Team Sabre, with two of its missions being "Kharg Island Infiltration" and "Kharg Island Oil Terminal".

== See also ==
- List of lighthouses in Iran
- Petroleum industry in Iran
