= Fort Mosselstein =

Castle in Bushehr Province, Iran

Coordinates: 29.2594°N 50.3350°E

- Kharg
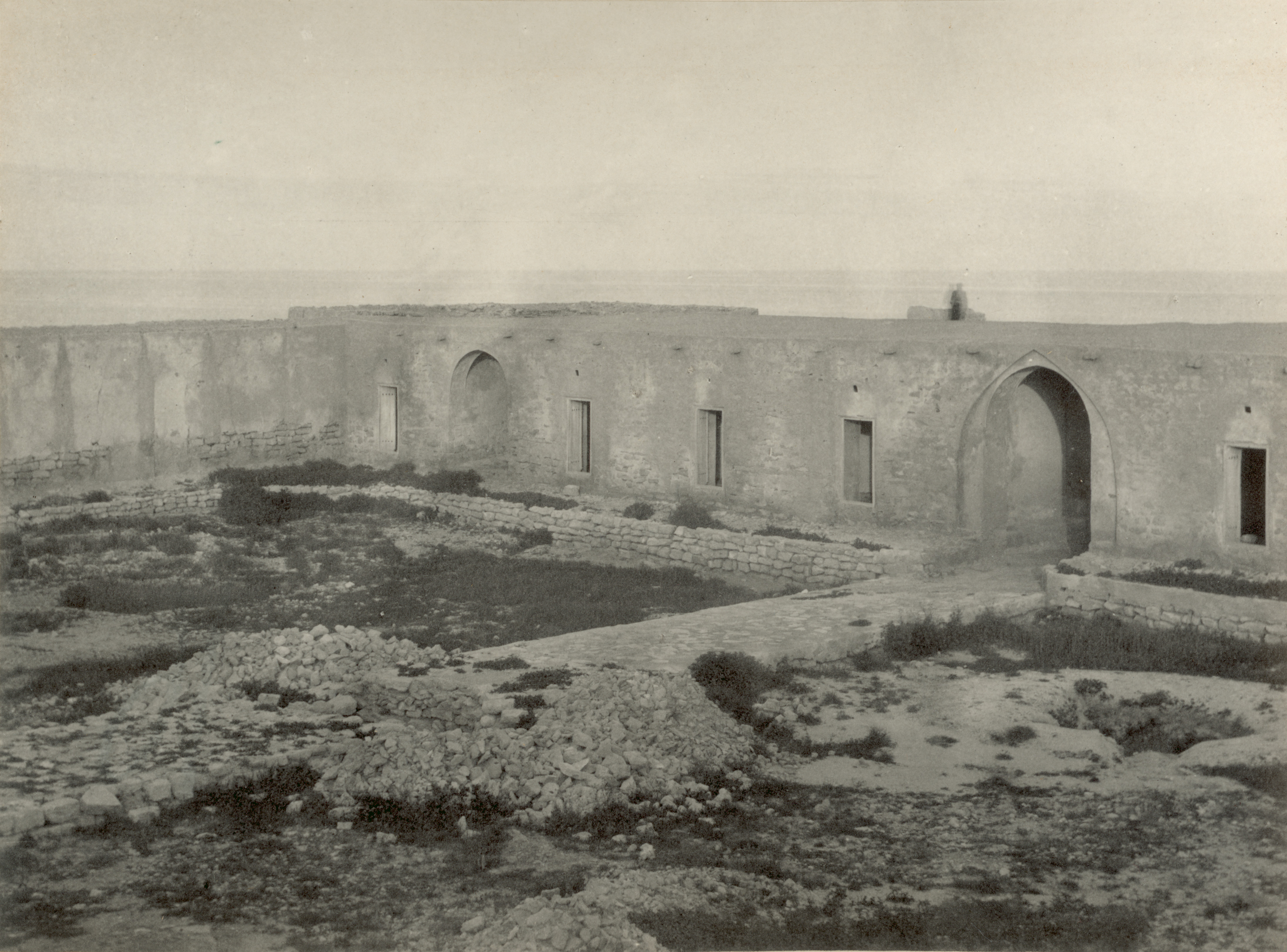
- Courtyard of a fortress, possibly Fort Mosselstein

Site information
- Type: Fortress
- Condition: Demolished

Site history
- Built: 1753
- Materials: Stone

Fort Mosselstein was a fortification of the Vereenigde Oostindische Compagnie (VOC) on the Iranian island Kharg. At the time, Kharg was called Kareek or Kareck.

== Description ==
Since 1723, the VOC's most important settlement in Persia was Bandar Abbas, located opposite the island of Hormuz. When the VOC was no longer successful in trade there in 1750, the Gentlemen XVII (the central VOC board) wanted to abandon the area. To avoid toll collection and to evade the English, Governor-General Jacob Mossel, at the instigation of the local resident, Tido Frederik von Kniphausen, decided to try one last time to continue trade at Kareek. In 1753, a settlement was built there, consisting of a rectangular stone fort that was named Mosselstein. Initially, the fort was armed with the cannons and ammunition from the abandoned ship 't Fortuijn. With this, the fort was strong enough to withstand an attack by local enemies. The militia (garrison) consisted of 1 sergeant, 2 corporals and 50 commoners (soldiers), 1 constable's mate and 8 gunners (artillerymen). From Batavia, 5,000 pounds of gunpowder and six 18-pound cannons were also brought in; due to a lack of gun carriages, these were mounted on garrison carriages. The residents purchased another 38 chests of gunpowder from the English. Finally, the residents indicated that it was necessary to cut off the corner of the island, on which the fort was built, with a moat. This work was estimated to cost 30,000 Guilders, but had the advantage that small ships could also use the moat as a harbor, making loading and unloading easier and faster. Javanese sugar and Indian textiles were sold in the Kareek settlement. It soon became clear that the settlement could not be made profitable, and it was closed on January 1, 1766. The Persian army attacked the fort and plundered it. The company's ships were not allowed to take the VOC's possessions.
