= Kharg (city) =

City in Bushehr province, Iran

Kharg Persian: خارگ
- City
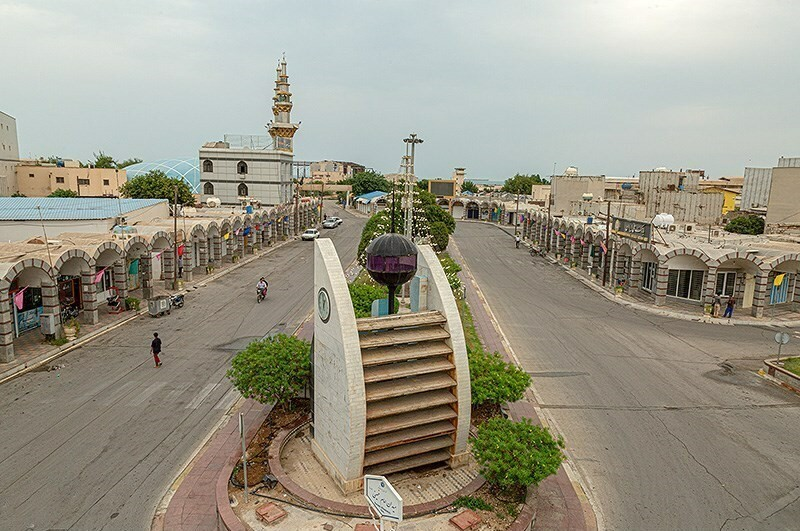
- Streets in the city of Kharg

- Location within Iran
- Country: Iran
- Province: Bushehr
- County: Bushehr
- District: Kharg

Population (2016)
  - Total: 8,193
- Time zone: UTC+3:30 (IRST)

Kharg (Persian: خارگ) (Note: Also romanized as Khārg; also known as Khark, also romanized as Khārk) is a city in, and the capital of, Kharg District in Bushehr County, Bushehr province, Iran. The city is located on Kharg Island in the Persian Gulf.

== Demographics ==
=== Population ===
In the 2006 census, the city's population was 8,196 people, in 1,963 households. The 2011 census counted 7,722 people, in 2,115 households. The 2016 census counted 8,193 people, in 2,374 households.

== Climate ==
Kharg has a hot semi-arid climate (Köppen climate classification: BSh).

Climate data for Khark Island
Month	Jan	Feb	Mar	Apr	May	Jun	Jul	Aug	Sep	Oct	Nov	Dec	Year
Mean daily maximum °C (°F)	18 (64)	18 (65)	23 (73)	27 (81)	32 (89)	33 (92)	35 (95)	36 (97)	34 (94)	31 (88)	26 (78)	20 (68)	28 (82)
Mean daily minimum °C (°F)	11 (51)	12 (53)	15 (59)	19 (67)	24 (76)	27 (81)	29 (84)	29 (84)	26 (79)	22 (72)	17 (63)	13 (55)	21 (69)
Average precipitation mm (inches)	74 (2.9)	46 (1.8)	20 (0.8)	10 (0.4)	2.5 (0.1)	0 (0)	0 (0)	2.5 (0.1)	0 (0)	2.5 (0.1)	41 (1.6)	81 (3.2)	280 (10.9)
Source: Weatherbase

== See also ==
Media related to Kharg at Wikimedia Commons
