= Kharg District =

District in Bushehr province, Iran

Kharg District Persian: بخش خارگ
- District
- Location within Iran
- Coordinates: 29°16′N 50°19′E
- Country: Iran
- Province: Bushehr
- County: Bushehr
- Capital: Kharg

Population (2016)
  - Total: 8,193
- Time zone: UTC+3:30 (IRST)

Kharg District (Persian: بخش خارگ) is in Bushehr County, Bushehr province, Iran. Its capital is the city of Kharg, and is broadly coextensive with the island of the same name.

== Demographics ==
=== Population ===
In the 2006 census, the Kharg district's population was 8,196, in 1,963 households. The 2011 census counted 7,722 people in 2,115 households. The 2016 census counted 8,193 people living in 2,374 households.

=== Administrative divisions ===
Kharg District Population
Administrative Divisions	2006	2011	2016
Kharg (city)	8,196	7,722	8,193
Total	8,196	7,722	8,193
