= Habib Borjian =

Linguist

Habib Borjian is an Iranian-American linguist who specializes in a wide variety of matters, including historical linguistics, language documentation, philology, and Iranian languages and literature. He was educated at Columbia University, the University of Tehran, and Yerevan State University. From 2010 to 2019, Borjian worked at Columbia University's Center for Iranian Studies. Since 2012, Borjian has been co-director of the Endangered Languages Project (Near East region). In the past, he also worked within the board of editors of the Encyclopædia Iranica, and served as associate editor of the Journal of Persianate Studies.
