= Biak–Numfoor rain forests =

Ecoregion in Indonesia

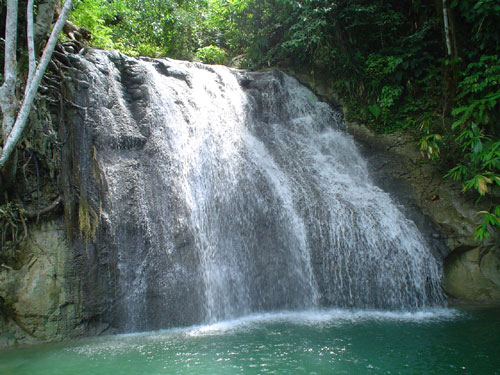
- Warsa Waterfall on Biak

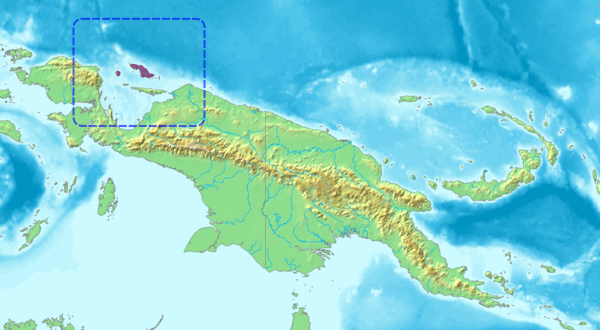
- Ecoregion territory (in purple)

Ecology
- Realm: Australasian realm
- Biome: tropical and subtropical moist broadleaf forests

Geography
- Area: 2,850 km^{2} (1,100 sq mi)
- Countries: Indonesia
- Province: Papua

Conservation
- Conservation status: Critical/endangered
- Protected: 20.86%

The Biak–Numfoor rain forests is a tropical moist forest ecoregion in Indonesia. The ecoregion covers the islands of Biak, Supiori, Numfoor, and several smaller islands, which lie in Cenderawasih Bay north of Yapen and New Guinea.

== Geography ==
Biak and Supiori are the largest islands in the ecoregion. They lie very close together, separated by a narrow and shallow channel. Numfoor lies southwest of Supiori and Biak. The Padaido Islands are a group of small islands south and southeast of Biak.

The surface geology of Biak and Supiori consists mainly of rugged coralline limestone, with outcrops of schist overlain by basaltic lavas and tuffs. The highest elevations in the ecoregion are on Supiori, where a ridge of mountains parallel to Supiori's southern coast reaches 1,034 metres (3,392 ft) in elevation.

The islands are oceanic, and not part of the New Guinea continental shelf. Their physical isolation from New Guinea meant that plants and animals had to cross the ocean to get to the islands, giving rise to a unique flora and fauna that includes several endemic species.

Politically the islands fall into two regencies. Biak Numfor Regency includes the islands of Biak and Numfor and the Padaido Islands. Supiori Regency covers Supiori, and was split from Biak Numfor in 2004 to become a separate regency.

== Climate ==
The ecoregion has a tropical rain forest climate.

== Flora ==
The original vegetation was tropical wet evergreen forest. The forests are similar in structure and species composition to the lowland rain forests of mainland New Guinea. Forests consisted of two types, alluvial forests in flatlands and river valleys, and hill forest on the hillsides.

The tree canopy of the alluvial forest is irregular and multi-tiered, with many emergent trees rising above the canopy. The forests have a shrub and herb layer in the understory with a variety of palms, climbers, epiphytes, and ferns. The tree canopy of the hill forests is lower and more closed than the alluvial forests. The understory has a more open shrub layer and a denser herbaceous layer, with fewer palms.

Dominant emergent trees on the islands include Pometia pinnata and species of Ficus, Alstonia, and Terminalia. Canopy trees include species of Garcinia, Diospyros, Myristica, Maniltoa, and Microcos. Large coastal stands of Calophyllum are found in northern Biak.

The recently discovered endemic palm Manjekia maturbongsii is found in lowland forests, between 80 and 170 meters elevation, on thin soils over limestone.

== Fauna ==
The ecoregion is home to 29 mammal species. Five species are endemic to the ecoregion – the Biak glider (Petaurus biacensis), Blue-eyed spotted cuscus (Spilocuscus wilsoni), Biak naked-backed fruit bat (Dobsonia emersa), Biak giant rat (Uromys boeadii), and Emma's giant rat (Uromys emmae). Biak and Supiori are home to endemic subspecies of the common spiny bandicoot, Echymipera kalubu philipi. The Japen rat (Rattus jobiensis) is near-endemic, and is also found on Yapen.

107 bird species live in the ecoregion. Fourteen species are endemic to the ecoregion – the Geelvink scrubfowl (Megapodius geelvinkianus), Geelvink pygmy parrot (Micropsitta geelvinkiana), Black-winged lory (Eos cyanogenia), Biak coucal (Centropus chalybeus), Biak paradise kingfisher (Tanysiptera riedelii), Numfor paradise kingfisher (Tanysiptera carolinae), Biak gerygone (Gerygone hypoxantha), Biak monarch (Monarcha brehmii), Biak flycatcher (Myiagra atra), Long-tailed starling (Aplonis magna), Biak white-eye (Zosterops mysorensis), Geelvink fruit dove (Ptilinopus speciosus), Geelvink imperial pigeon (Ducula geelvinkiana), and Biak scops owl (Otus beccarii). The ecoregion corresponds to the Geelvink Islands endemic bird area.

The Biak white-lipped python (Leiopython biakensis) is endemic to Biak. The frog Oreophryne kapisa is endemic to Biak and Supiori.

Endemic butterflies include the Biak tiger (Parantica marcia), Biak threespot crow (Euploea tripunctata), and Damias biakensis.

== Conservation and threats ==
In 2000, 97% of Biak Numfor Regency, which includes Biak, Numfor, and the Padaido Islands, had tree cover. 158,000 hectares, or 70% of its land area, was primary forest, and the rest was secondary forest or tree plantations. In 2000 98% of Supiori had tree cover with 58,500 ha, or 87% of its land area, covered in primary forest.

From 2001 to 2020, Biak Numfor Regency lost 15,400 ha of tree cover, a 7.1% decrease in tree cover since 2000. 3,960 ha, or 27%, was humid primary forest, a 2.5% decrease since 2000. From 2001 to 2020 Supiori lost 1,300 ha of tree cover, about a 2% loss since 2000. About half of the tree cover lost (572 ha) was primary forest.

== Protected areas ==
20.86% of the ecoregion is in protected areas. Protected areas include Biak Utara Nature Reserve (61.38 km^{2}) on Biak, and Pulau Supiori Nature Reserve (419.9 km^{2}) on Supiori.
