= Biak Archipelago =

Island group in Papua province, eastern Indonesia

Coordinates: 1°00′S 136°00′E

Location of Biak Islands

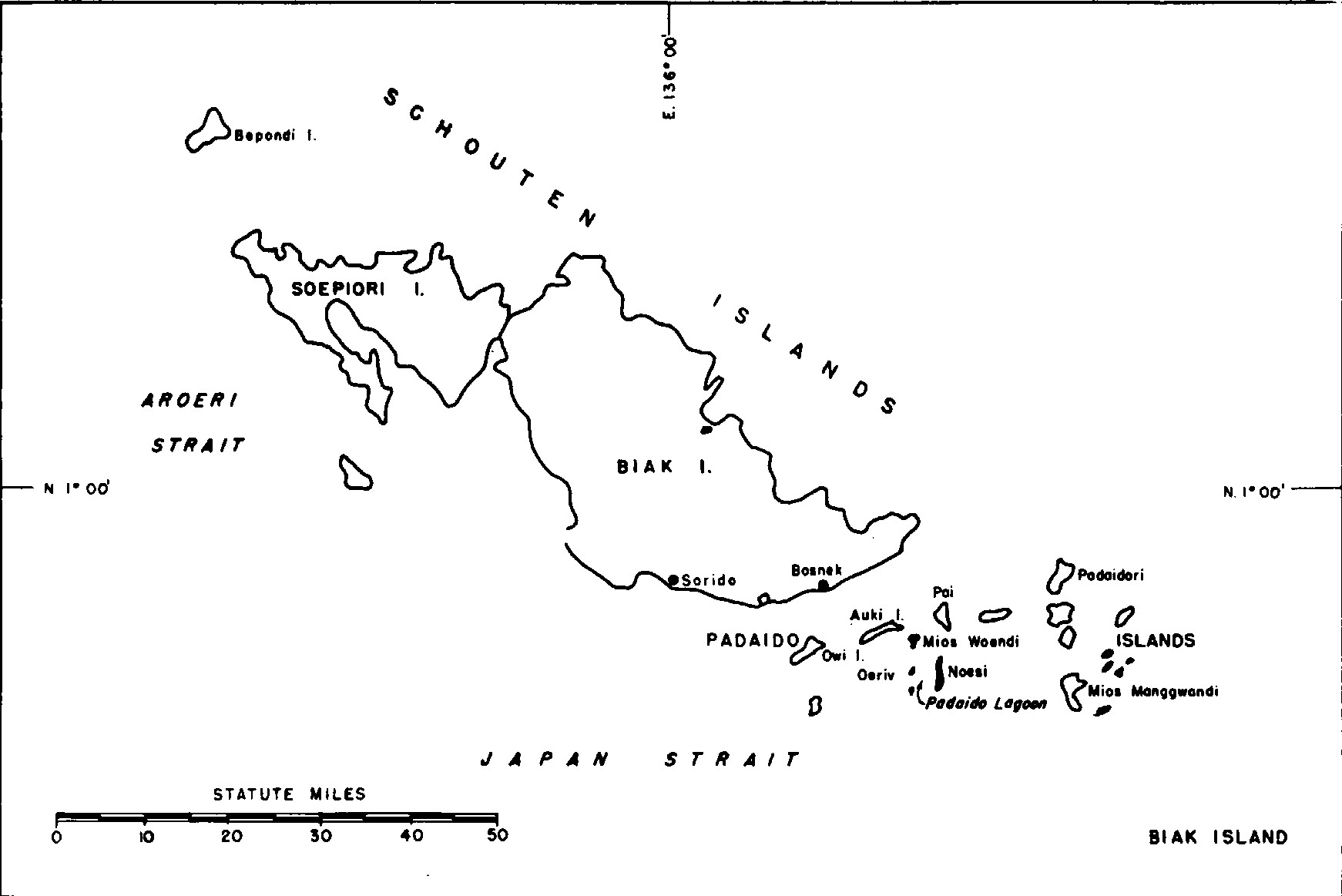
Biak and Supiori Islands with minor islands and towns

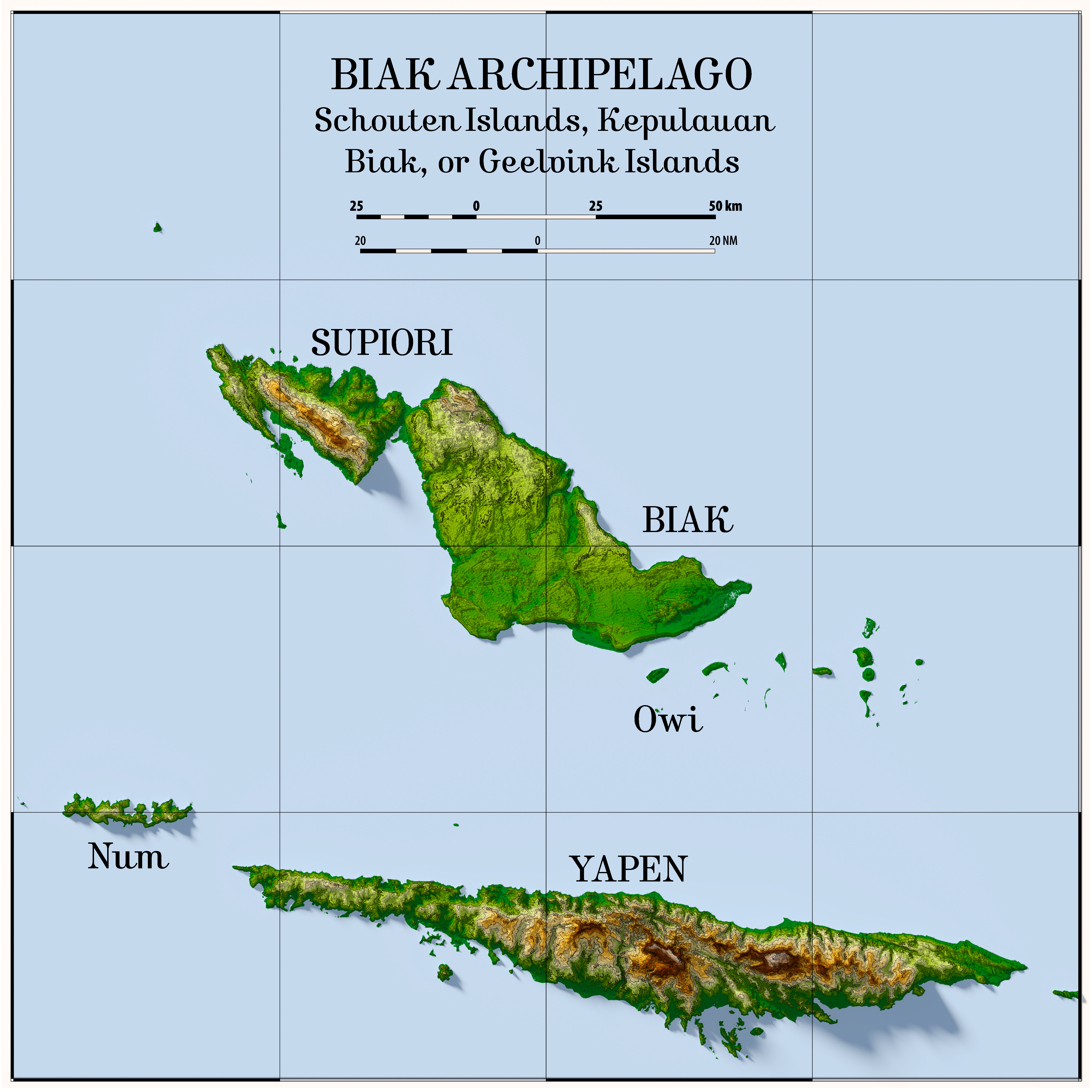
Biak Islands in Cenderawasih Bay.

The Biak Islands (Indonesian: Kepulauan Biak, also Schouten Islands or Geelvink Islands) are an island group of Papua province, eastern Indonesia in the Cenderawasih Bay (or Geelvink Bay) 50 km off the north-western coast of the island of New Guinea. The group consists of the main islands of Biak, Supiori and Numfor, and numerous smaller islands, mostly covered in rain forest. The population of the archipelago is about 130,000.

== History ==
The first recorded sighting by Europeans of the Schouten Islands was by the Portuguese navigator Jorge de Menezes in 1526. On the voyage from Malacca to Maluku, via northern Borneo, he was further carried eastward by a storm and strong winds. Jorge de Menezes landed at Biak, where he was forced to winter. Inspired by Malay, Moluccan or local Papuan names, he named the archipelago, and eventually the coasts of western Papua "Islands of Papuas". Biak was thenceforth called in Portuguese maps Ilha de Dom Jorge or Ilha onde invernou Dom Jorge, and Ilha de S. Jorge.

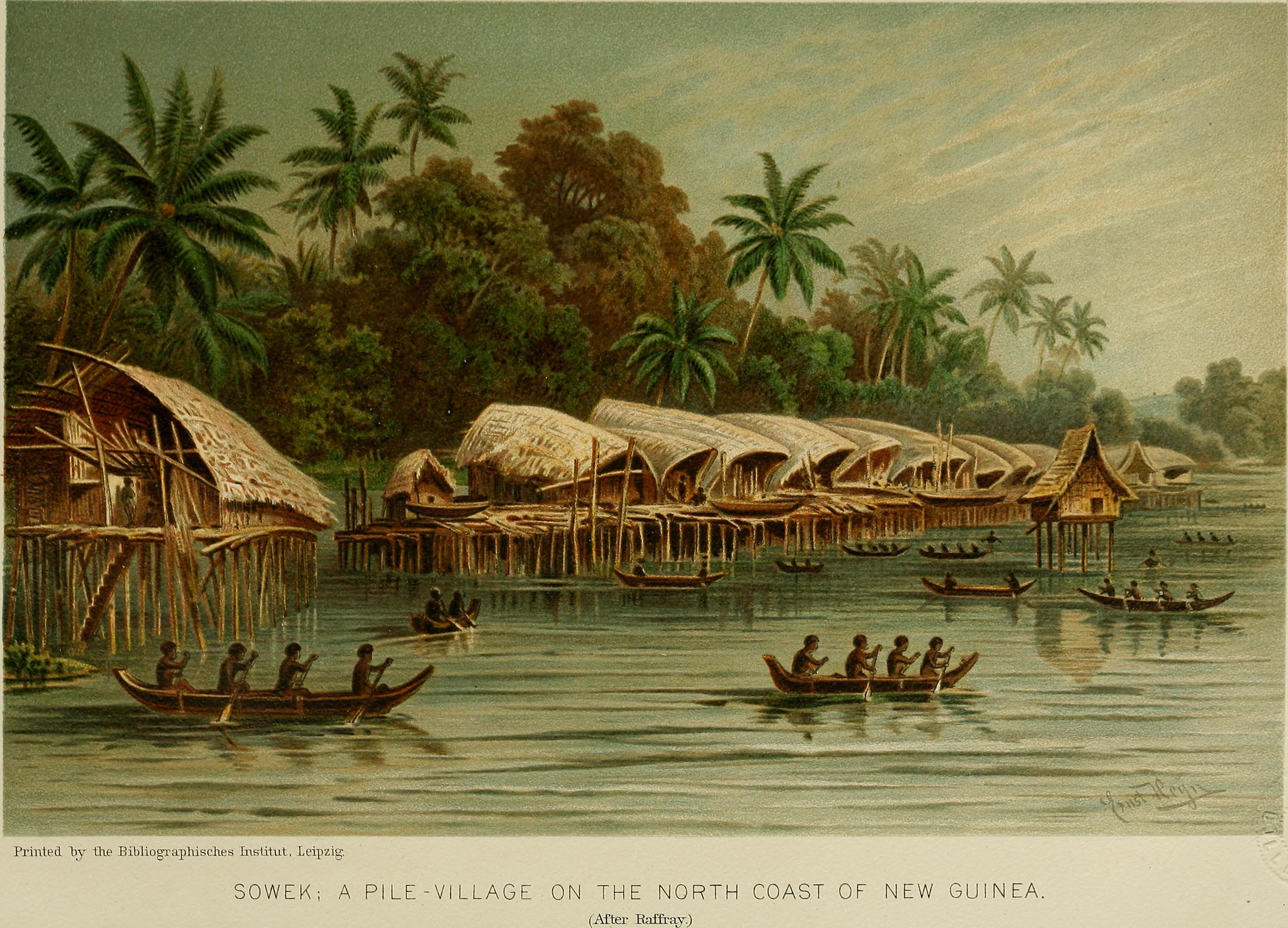
Sowek Village in Aruri Islands near Supiori, c. 1896

The archipelago was also sighted by Spanish navigator Álvaro de Saavedra who landed on Yapen on June 24, 1528, when trying to return from Tidore to New Spain. The islands were named Islas de Oro (Golden Islands in Spanish). In 1545 they were visited by Íñigo Ortiz de Retes on board the galleon San Juan.

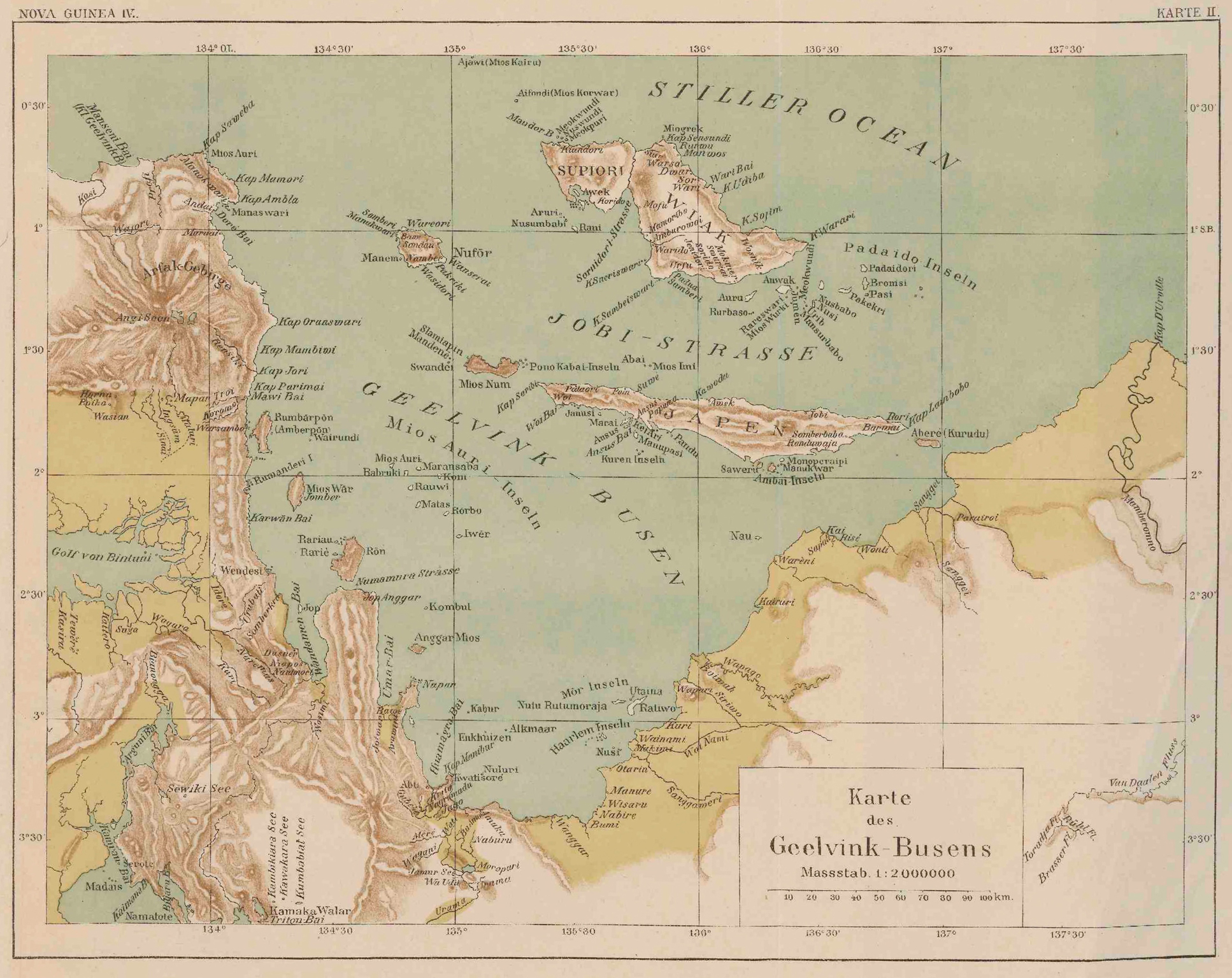
1917 map of Cenderawasih Bay (then Geelvink Bay) including the Schouten Islands (in German)

The archipelago was first mapped in the Portuguese charts of Gaspar Viegas (c. 1537), an anonymous map of 1540, and on the maps of João de Lisboa and of Bartolomeu Velho (c. 1560), and by other Portuguese, Spanish, and Dutch maps.

The Schouten Islands were eventually named after Dutch explorer Willem Schouten, who explored them in 1615.

The Tidore Sultanate had tributary ties with the islands. Seafarers from the region used to regularly pay homage to the sultan.

== Demographics ==
The Biak Islands are among the most densely populated parts of Papua province.

== Ecology ==
=== Terrestrial ===
These small islands have been designated the Biak–Numfoor rain forests. They have the most highly endemic avifauna of any single area in the New Guinea region. The forest consists of similar types of trees to that on mainland New Guinea.

There are over 100 bird species on the islands, of which 11 to 16 are endemic, that is, restricted to this small island group. These include: black-winged lory (Eos cyanogenia); the small tree-climbing Geelvink pygmy parrot (Micropsitta geelvinkiana); Biak scrubfowl (Megapodius geelvinkianus); Geelvink imperial pigeon (Ducula geelvinkiana); Geelvink fruit dove (Ptilinopus speciosus); Biak coucal (Centropus chalybeus); two tree kingfishers, Biak paradise kingfisher (Tanysiptera riedelii) and Numfor paradise kingfisher (Tanysiptera carolinae); Biak gerygone (Gerygone hypoxantha); Biak monarch (Monarcha brehmii); Biak flycatcher (Myiagra atra); long-tailed starling (Aplonis magna); and Biak white-eye (Zosterops mysorensis).

As well as the birds, there are a number of endemic mammals, although there are only 29 mammal species on the islands. The endemics include: Biak naked-backed fruit bat (Dobsonia emersaa) a species of barebacked fruit bat (so-called because their wings are attached to the back rather than the sides, giving this type of bat a different appearance to most species; a marsupial Biak glider (Petaurus biacensis); Japen rat (Rattus jobiensis); and two species of giant naked-tailed rat, Uromys boeadii and Uromys emmae.

The islands also have a number of endemic butterflies and one endemic spider Diolenius angustipes.

Much of the forest has been cut down for logging or to clear land for planting especially on Biak Island, which is the most populous in the area, although logging has slowed. There are two protected areas, which are close to each other: Pulau Supiori Nature Reserve, which is most of Supiori Island; and Biak Utara Nature Reserve which is an area on Biak Island just across the bridge from Supiori. However the logging industry may return, while birds are vulnerable to collectors and just because they have such a limited range of habitat on these small islands. The area needs more study.

=== Marine ===
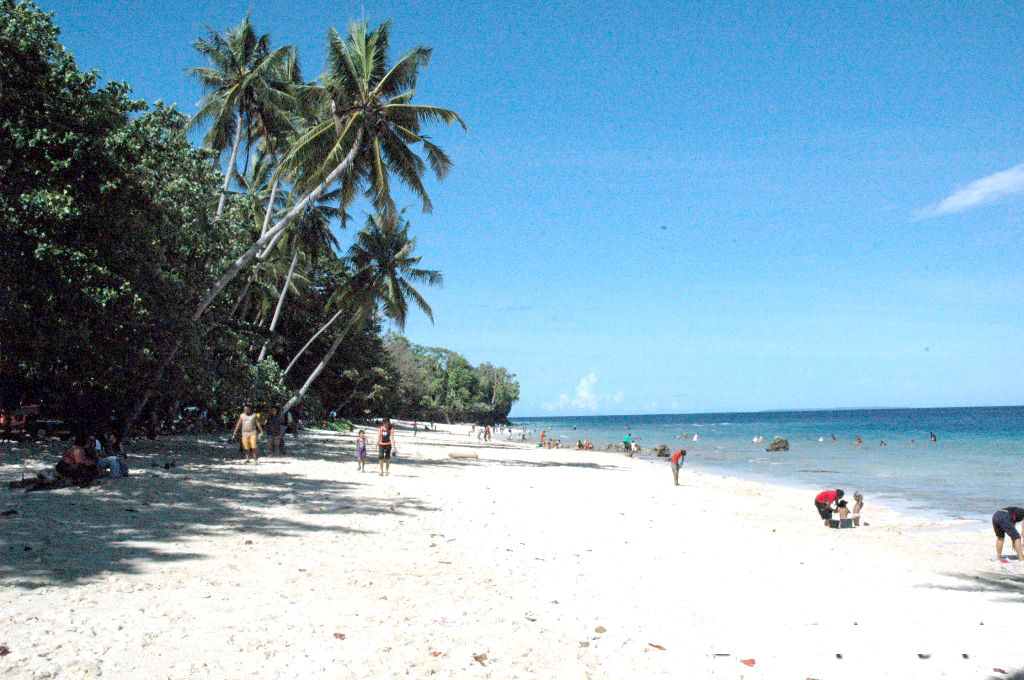
Bindusi, East Biak, Biak Numfor Regency, Papua, Indonesia

The seas around the Biak Islands are part of the Coral Triangle, a marine region which has the world's greatest diversity of coral reef species. Diving in the waters off Biak is a popular activity for tourists.

The islands have two marine protected areas. The Biak Numfor Locally Managed Marine Area, established in 2015, protects Numfor's eastern coast and the southern coast of Biak. Padaido Marine Recreation Park, established in 2009, protects the waters around the Padaido Archipelago, a group of small islands lying south and southeast of Biak.

== See also ==
- Schouten languages
