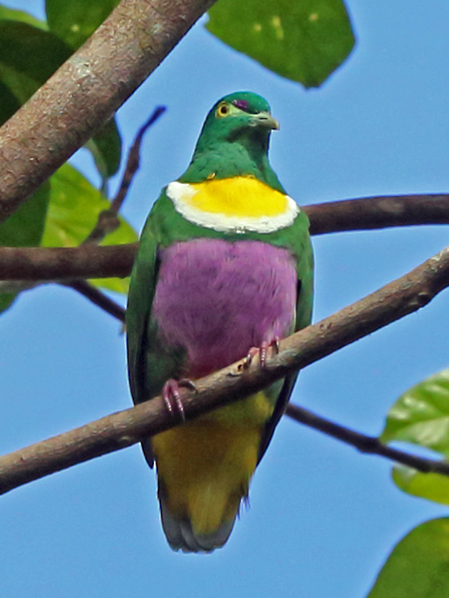

Conservation status
- Least Concern (IUCN 3.1)

Scientific classification
- Kingdom: Animalia
- Phylum: Chordata
- Class: Aves
- Order: Columbiformes
- Family: Columbidae
- Genus: Ptilinopus
- Species: P. speciosus

Binomial name
- Ptilinopus speciosus Schlegel, 1871

= Geelvink fruit dove =

Species of bird

The Geelvink fruit dove (Ptilinopus speciosus) is a species of bird in the family Columbidae. It is native to several islands, including Biak, Supiori, Numfor, and the smaller Padaido Islands, collectively known as the Schouten or Geelvink Islands, which lie north of New Guinea.

Its natural habitat is tropical moist lowland forests. It is also found in the islands' degraded former forests.

The Geelvink fruit dove was formerly considered conspecific with the yellow-bibbed fruit dove (P. solomonensis), but was recognized as a distinct species by the IOC in 2021.

== Description ==
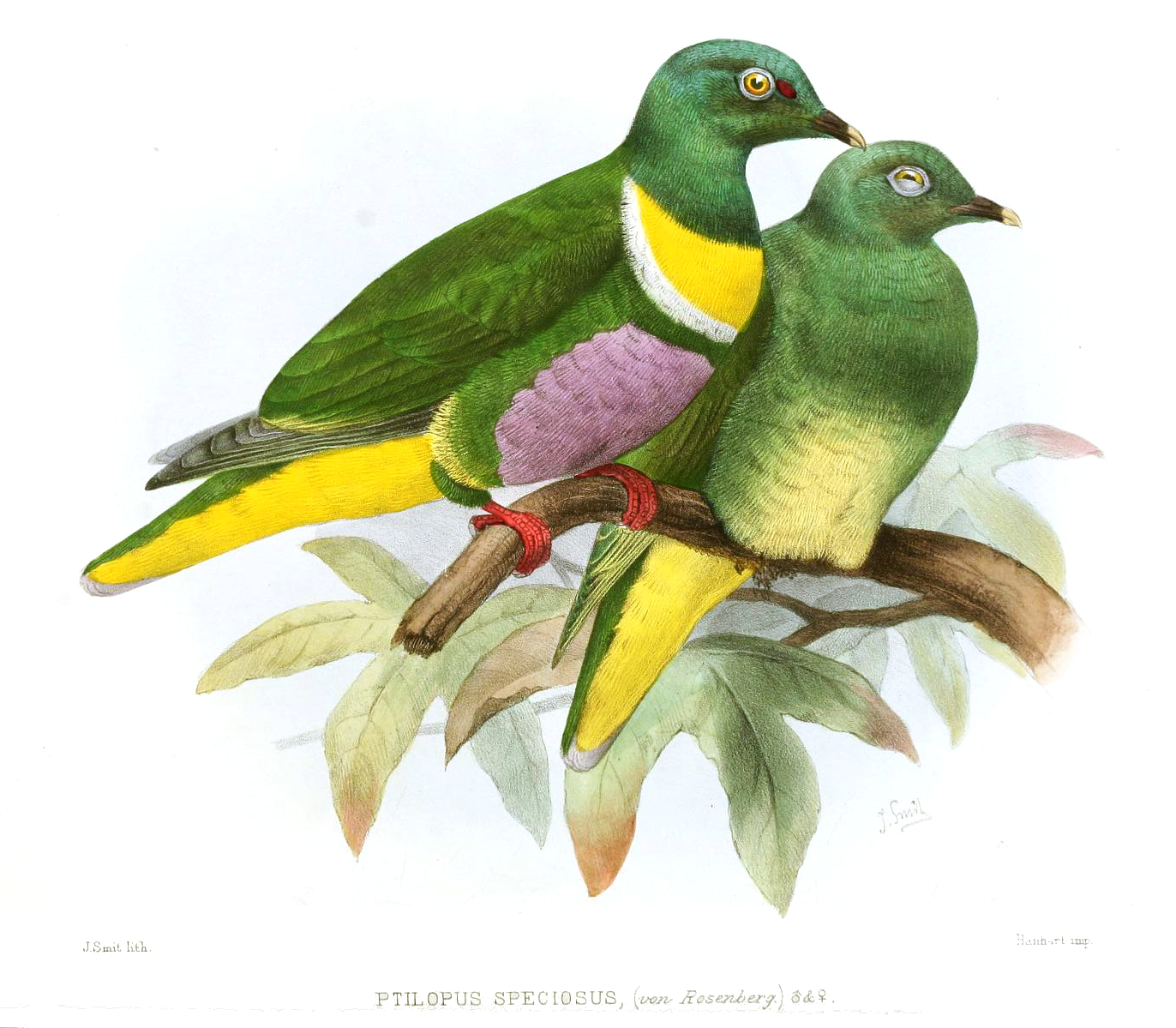
Illustration by Joseph Smit

The male has a dark green head and upperparts, a mauve belly, a bright yellow breast band bordered by white, and bold lime-yellow bare skin around the eyes. The female and juveniles are almost entirely green with yellow fringes to the belly feathers.
