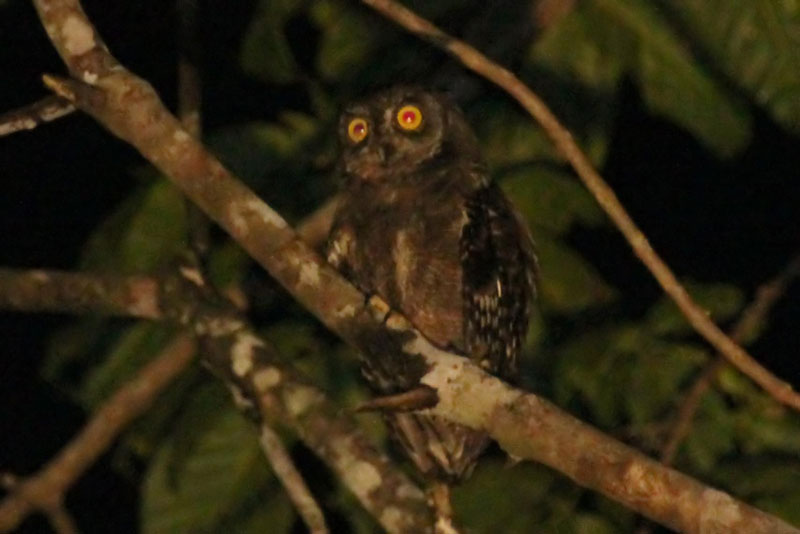

Conservation status
- Near Threatened (IUCN 3.1)
- CITES Appendix II

Scientific classification
- Kingdom: Animalia
- Phylum: Chordata
- Class: Aves
- Order: Strigiformes
- Family: Strigidae
- Genus: Otus
- Species: O. beccarii

Binomial name
- Otus beccarii (Salvadori, 1876)

= Biak scops owl =

Species of owl

The Biak scops owl (Otus beccarii) is a species of owl endemic to the twin islands of Biak-Supiori in Cenderawasih Bay, Papua, Indonesia.

Biak scops owls are 20–25 cm in length. They have dark brown and rufous forms (likely morphs) with long ear-tufts and a pale whitish-brown facial disc. Their call is described as hoarse and corvid-like. Their diet mostly consists of small vertebrates or insects. Primarily lives at forest edges and or within forests; may occasionally live near villages. They are rarely seen, and little is known about their reproduction.
