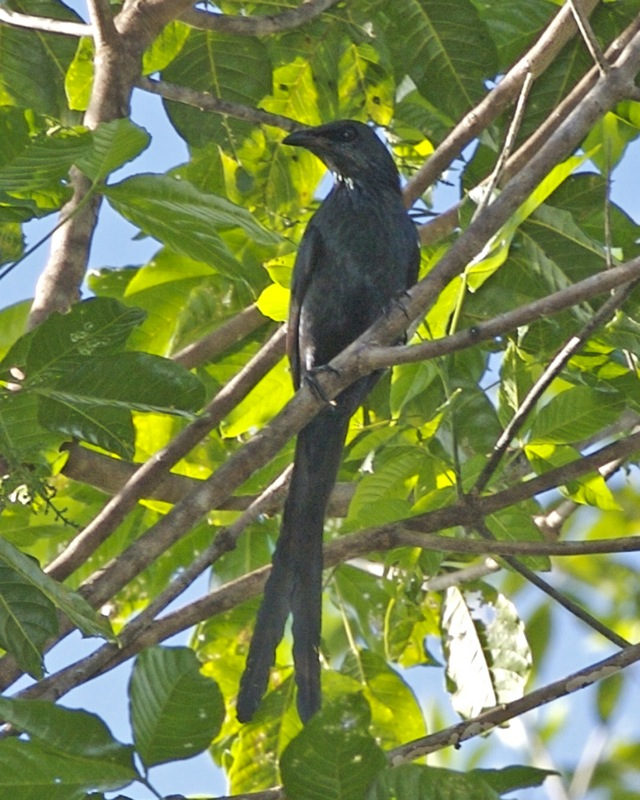

Conservation status
- Least Concern (IUCN 3.1)

Scientific classification
- Kingdom: Animalia
- Phylum: Chordata
- Class: Aves
- Order: Passeriformes
- Family: Sturnidae
- Genus: Aplonis
- Species: A. magna

Binomial name
- Aplonis magna (Schlegel, 1871)
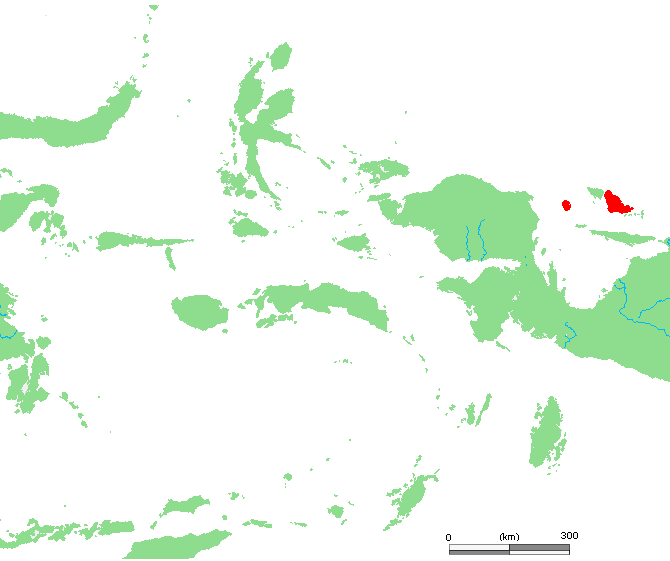
- Global range (In red)

= Long-tailed starling =

Species of bird

The long-tailed starling (Aplonis magna) is a species of starling in the family Sturnidae. It is endemic to the Schouten Islands off West Papua, in Indonesia, an important area of bird endemism. The species was once treated as part of a superspecies with the shining starling. There are two subspecies, the nominate race, which occurs on Biak, and brevicauda, which is found on Numfor Island. It occurs in a wide range of habitats at all altitudes, including natural forest and forest edges, as well as human modified secondary forests and gardens. In spite of its tiny global range the species is not considered threatened by human activities and remains common within its range, and is therefore listed as least concern by the IUCN.

The long-tailed starling is a large starling, ranging from 28 to 41 cm (11–16 in) in length, including the tail. There are no differences between the sexes. The tail is very long, as long or longer than the body in the nominate race, although in the race brevicauda it is only two-thirds as long as the body. In the wild they cock and fan these large tails. The plumage of this species is black with an oily green gloss over the body, although the subspecies brevicauda is less glossy than the nominate. The gloss on the head is bronze coloured and the feathers of the fore-head are bristled. The feet and bill are black, and the iris is brown.

Little is known about the biology of this species. They are conspicuous birds, sitting in prominent open perches in trees in a manner reminiscent of a drongo. Its calls have been described as a series of loud warbles, and it also gives a descending slurred "cheeeuw". The species occurs in small groups or in pairs, foraging for fruit in trees and in the undergrowth. Nothing is known about its breeding biology apart from that it nests high in trees.
