= Biak Numfor Regency =

Regency in Papua, Indonesia

Biak Numfor Regency Kabupaten Biak Numfor
- Regency
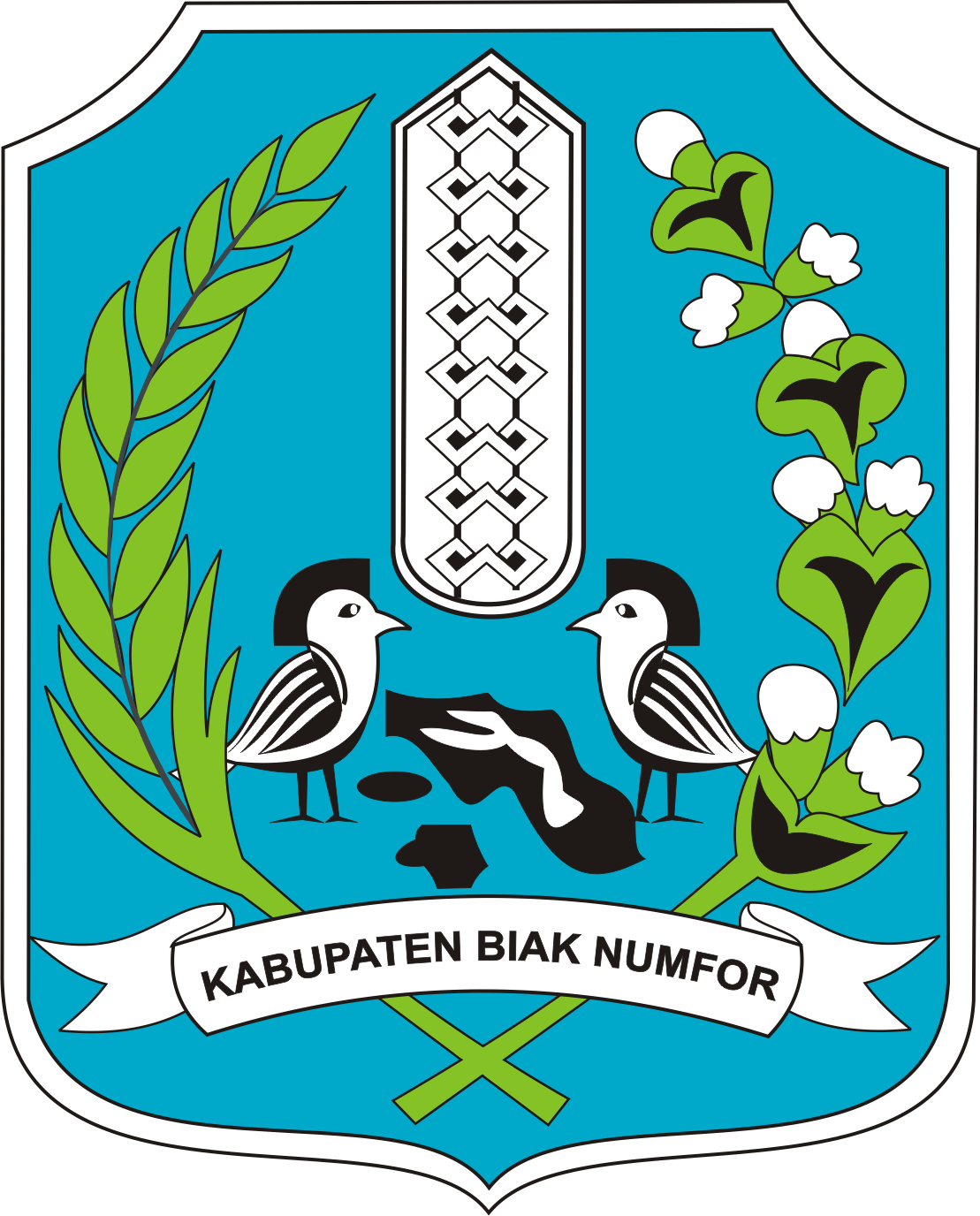
- Coat of arms
- Motto: Memantapkan Kota Jasa Sebagai Jembatan Emas Biak Sejahtera di Masa Depan (Strengthening the City of Services as the Golden Bridge for Prosperous Biak in the Future)
- Location in Papua Province

- Location in Indonesian Papua Location in Indonesia
- Coordinates: 1°10.17′S 136°5.24′E
- Country: Indonesia
- Province: Papua
- Capital: Biak

Government
  - Regent: Markus Oktovianus Mansnembra
  - Vice Regent: Jimmy Carter Rumbarar Kapissa

Area
  - Total: 2,601.99 km^{2} (1,004.63 sq mi)
- Elevation: 768 m (2,520 ft)

Population (mid 2024 estimate)
  - Total: 150,318
  - Density: 57.7704/km^{2} (149.625/sq mi)
- Time zone: UTC+9 (Indonesia Eastern Time)
- Area code: (+62) 981
- Website: biakkab.go.id

Biak Numfor Regency is one of the regencies (kabupaten) in Papua Province of Western New Guinea in northeastern Indonesia.

== Geography ==
The regency consists two of the three largest members of the Biak Islands archipelago at the northern entrance into Cenderawasih Bay. These two large islands are Biak and Numfor; the remaining large island within the Schouten Islands group, Supiori Island, was formerly also part of the regency but was administratively split off to form the separate Supiori Regency on 8 January 2004. Numfor Island lies due west of Biak. The remaining Biak Numfor Regency also includes the 54 small islands of the Padaido Archipelago, to the southeast of Biak, and there are 87 other small islands within the regency.

Biak Numfor Regency covers an area of 2,601.99 km^{2}. and had a population of 126,798 at the 2010 Census and 134,650 at the 2020 Census. The official estimate as of mid-2024 was 150,318 (comprising 76,214 males and 74,104 females). The regency's administrative centre is the town (kota) of Biak, situated on the south coast of the island of the same name; more than half of the population of the regency lives in the urbanised area comprising the town and the neighbouring district of Samofa, which adjoins the town on its north side.

== Administrative districts ==
The existing regency comprises nineteen districts (distrik), tabulated below with their populations at the 2010 Census and the 2020 Census, together with the official estimates as of mid-2024. The table also includes the location of the district headquarters, the number of administrative villages (totaling 254 rural kampung and 14 urban kelurahan) and minor islands within each district, and its post code.

| Kode Wilayah | Name of District (distrik) | Area in km^{2} | Pop'n 2010 Census | Pop'n 2020 Census | Pop'n mid 2024 Estimate | Admin centre | No. of villages | No. of islands | Post code |
|---|---|---|---|---|---|---|---|---|---|
| 91.06.04 | Numfor Barat (West Numfor) | 90.83 | 2,511 | 1,600 | 2,441 | Kameri | 12 | 9 | 98564 |
| 91.06.17 | Orkeri | 62.42 | 1,772 | 1,633 | 2,025 | Pakreki | 9 | 2 | 98565 |
| 91.06.05 | Numfor Timur (East Numfor) | 49.54 | 1,273 | 1,671 | 2,039 | Yenburwo | 9 | - | 98562 |
| 91.06.16 | Bruyadori | 101.73 | 1,868 | 2,077 | 2,253 | Duai | 10 | 24 | 98561 |
| 91.06.18 | Poiru | 79.93 | 1,833 | 1,344 | 1,922 | Andei | 9 | - | 98563 |
| | Total Numfor Island | 384.45 | 9,257 | 8,325 | 10,680 | | 49 | 35 | |
| 91.06.10 | Padaido | 30.72 | 1,741 | 1,963 | 2,508 | Pai | 11 | 37 | 98556 |
| 91.06.19 | Almando Padaido | 50.86 | 2,166 | 2,196 | 2,672 | Pasi | 13 | 17 | 98555 |
| | Total Padaido Islands | 81.58 | 3,907 | 4,159 | 5,180 | | 24 | 54 | |
| 91.06.03 | Biak Timur (East Biak) | 125.51 | 6,686 | 6,898 | 8,597 | Bosnik | 26 | 4 | 98541 |
| 91.06.20 | Oridek | 181.66 | 4,730 | 4,987 | 5,632 | Wadibu | 14 | 8 | 98542 |
| 91.06.01 | Biak Kota (Biak town) | 42.94 | 41,731 | 43,724 | 43,845 | Biak | 22 ^{(a)} | 3 | 98511: 98534 |
| 91.06.12 | Samofa | 230.54 | 27,711 | 34,414 | 35,971 | Darfuar | 17 ^{(b)} | - | 98551 |
| 91.06.11 | Yendidori | 275.13 | 7,865 | 8,610 | 9,245 | Yendidori | 19 | 4 | 98547 |
| 91.06.02 | Biak Utara (North Biak) | 277.77 | 6,534 | 7,535 | 8,028 | Korem | 16 | - | 98544 |
| 91.06.14 | Andey | 270.17 | 2,329 | 1,766 | 2,887 | Rodifu | 11 | - | 98543 |
| 91.06.09 | Warsa | 68.37 | 4,470 | 5,107 | 5,945 | Amoi | 20 | 4 | 98553 |
| 91.06.13 | Yawosi | 39.63 | 1,960 | 2,143 | 2,386 | Wasori | 8 | - | 98552 |
| 91.06.21 | Bondifuar | 129.14 | 212 | 452 | 584 | Sansundi | 5 | 3 | 98554 |
| 91.06.08 | Biak Barat (West Biak) | 252.34 | 5,420 | 5,994 | 6,808 | Yomdori | 22 | 10 | 98545 |
| 91.06.15 | Swandiwe | 242.76 | 3,986 | 4,386 | 4,530 | Wombrisauw | 15 | - | 98546 |
| | Total Biak Island | 2,135.96 | 113,634 | 122,166 | 134,458 | | 195 | 54 | |
| | Regency Totals | 2,601.99 | 126,798 | 134,650 | 150,318 | | 268 | 143 | |

Note: (a) including seven urban kelurahan - Sorido has a postcode of 98517, Waupnor of 98515, Saramon of 98514, Burokub of 98513, Fandoi of 98512, Mandala of 98511 and Yanures of 98534.
(b) including seven urban kelurahan - Samofa, Brambaken, Karang Mulia, Yafdas, Mansinyas, Snerbo and Anjarew (all sharing the 98551 postcode) .

Numfor Island (comprising the first five districts listed above) were intended to be split off to form a separate regency under proposals announced in 2013 by the Indonesian Government, although all such new measures have been placed on hold since 2013. The Padaido Archipelago geographically comprises the 54 islands in Paidado District (southeast of Biak) and Aimando Padaido District (further to the east), plus Pulau Owi, Pulau Purbasbeba and Pulau Ruisbasbedar (islands which are part of Biak Timur District).

== Diving sites ==
There are at least 12 diving sites in the Padaido Archipelago, which comprises 54 islets, with its pristine water, wide sandy beaches and high biodiversity, about two hours from Biak town by speedboat. The visibility is well up to 30 metres, and a favourite site is the World War II preserved wreckage of a US Catalina seaplane, with angelfish, lionfish, damselfish and other smaller fishes swimming around the wreckage.
