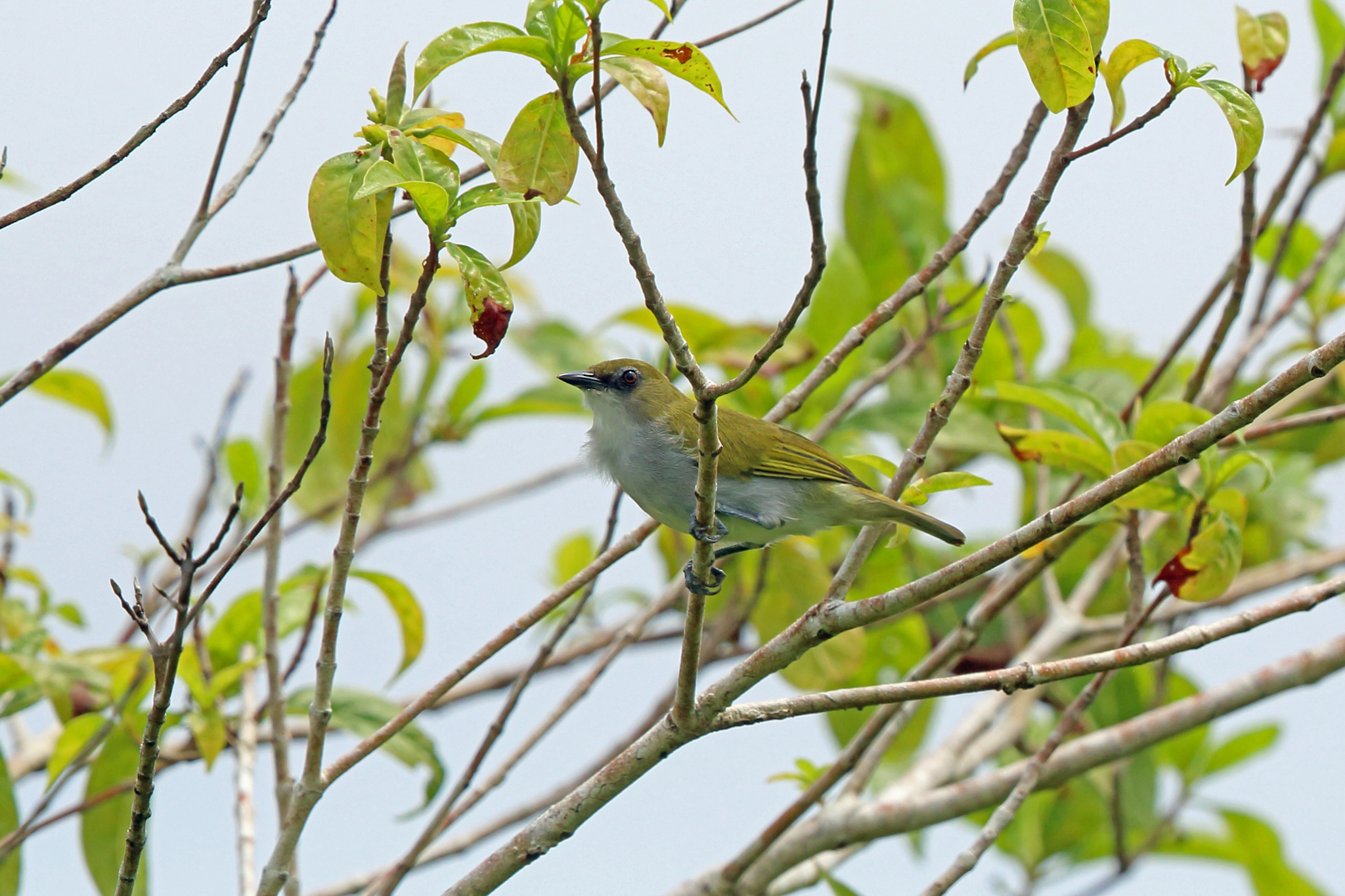

Conservation status
- Near Threatened (IUCN 3.1)

Scientific classification
- Kingdom: Animalia
- Phylum: Chordata
- Class: Aves
- Order: Passeriformes
- Family: Zosteropidae
- Genus: Zosterops
- Species: Z. mysorensis

Binomial name
- Zosterops mysorensis Meyer, AB, 1874

= Biak white-eye =

Species of bird

The Biak white-eye (Zosterops mysorensis) is a species of bird in the family Zosteropidae. It is endemic to the islands of Biak and Supiori in West Papua, Indonesia.

Its natural habitat is subtropical or tropical moist lowland forests. It is threatened by habitat loss.
