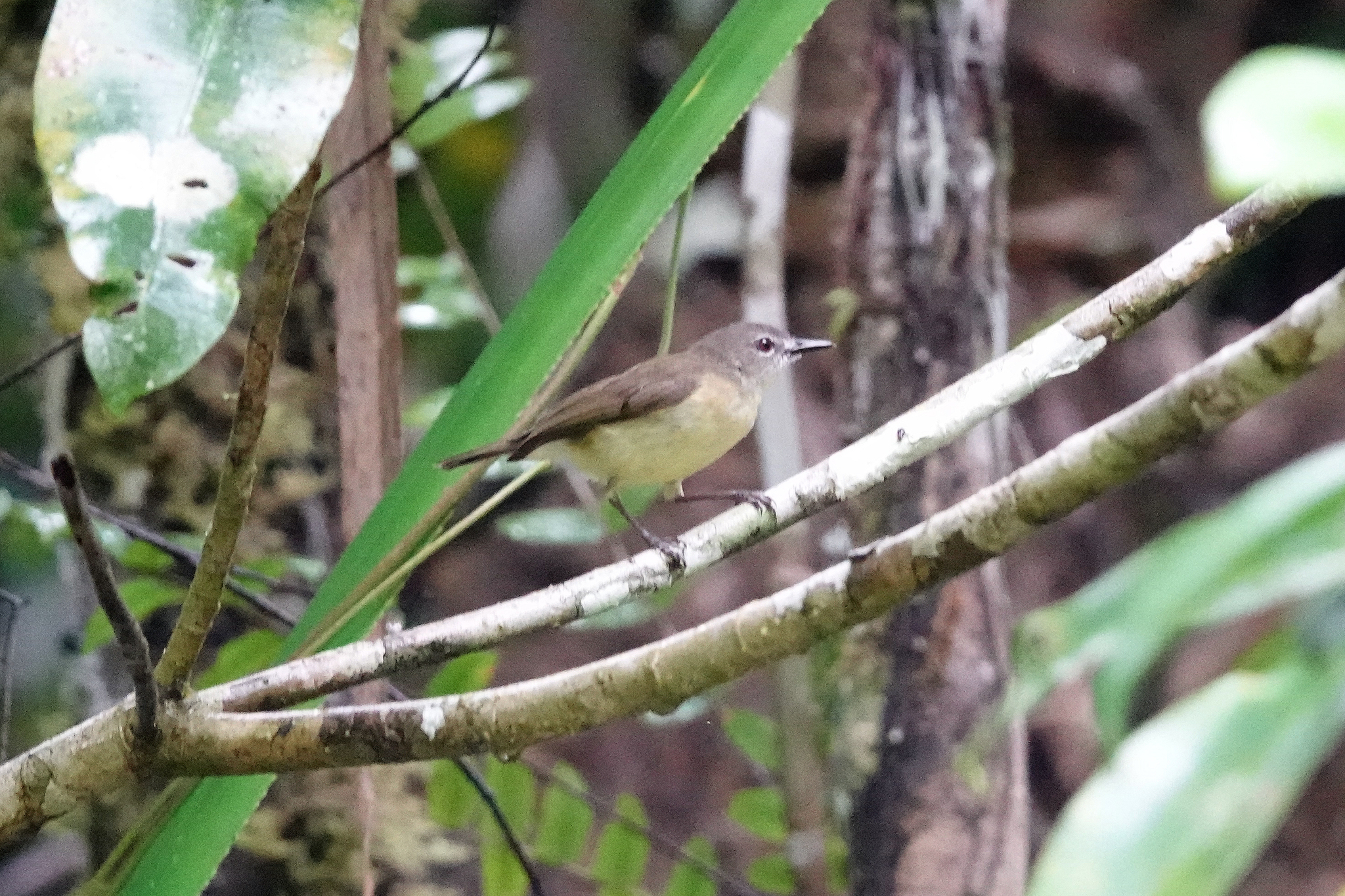

Conservation status
- Near Threatened (IUCN 3.1)

Scientific classification
- Kingdom: Animalia
- Phylum: Chordata
- Class: Aves
- Order: Passeriformes
- Family: Acanthizidae
- Genus: Gerygone
- Species: G. hypoxantha

Binomial name
- Gerygone hypoxantha Salvadori, 1878
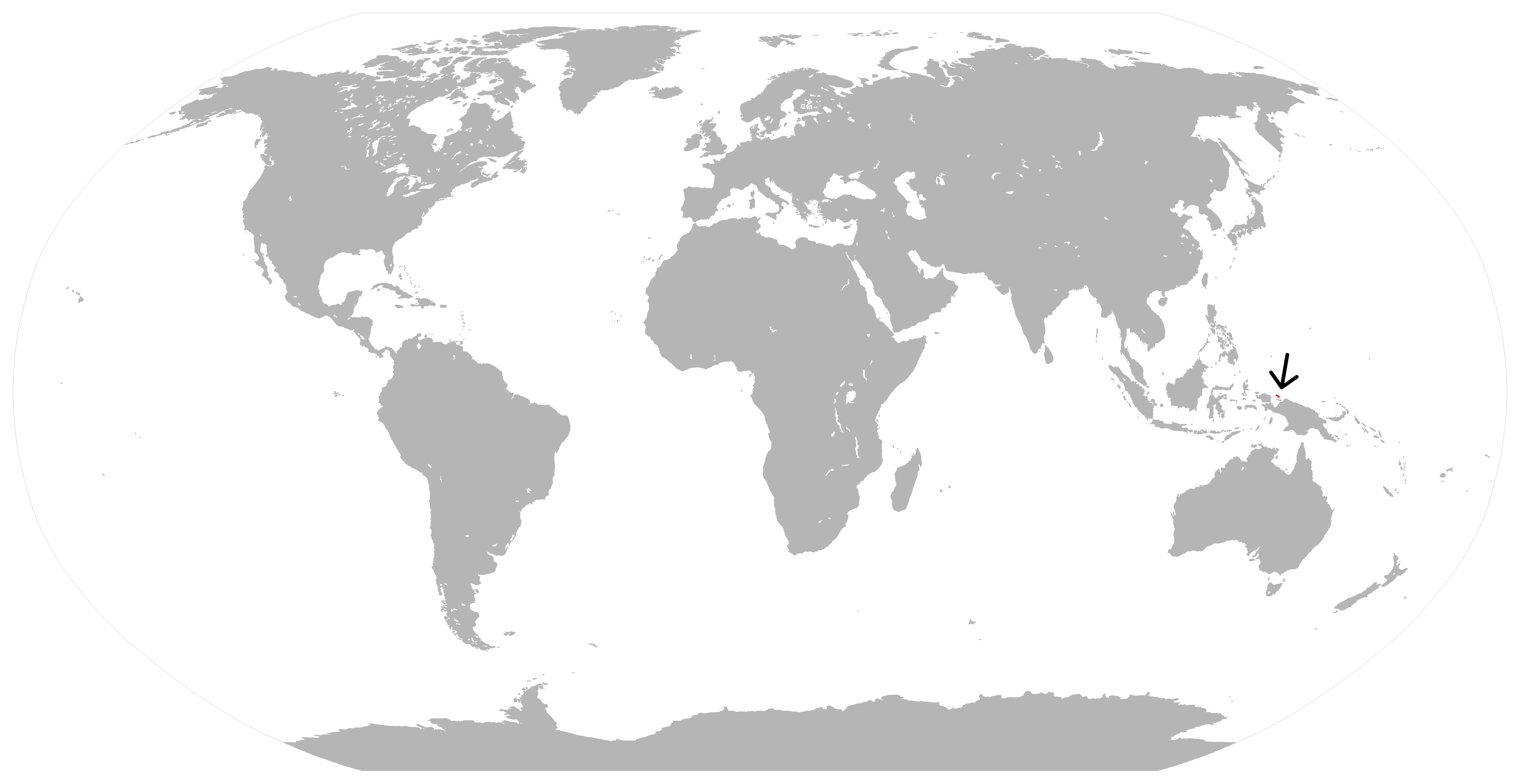

Synonyms
- Gerygone magnirostris hypoxantha

= Biak gerygone =

Species of bird

The Biak gerygone (Gerygone hypoxantha) is a species of bird in the family Acanthizidae. It is endemic to the islands of Biak and Supiori in West Papua, Indonesia.

Its natural habitats are subtropical or tropical moist lowland forests and subtropical or tropical moist shrubland. It is threatened by habitat loss and is listed as near threatened by the IUCN.

It was previously treated as a subspecies of the large-billed gerygone (Gerygone magnirostris).
