= Japen rat =

Conservation status
- Least Concern (IUCN 3.1)

Scientific classification
- Kingdom: Animalia
- Phylum: Chordata
- Class: Mammalia
- Order: Rodentia
- Family: Muridae
- Genus: Rattus
- Species: R. jobiensis

Binomial name
- Rattus jobiensis Rümmler, 1935

Species of rodent

The Japen rat (Rattus jobiensis) is a species of rodent in the family Muridae found only in Yapen, Biak-Supiori, and Owi islands of West Papua, Indonesia.
