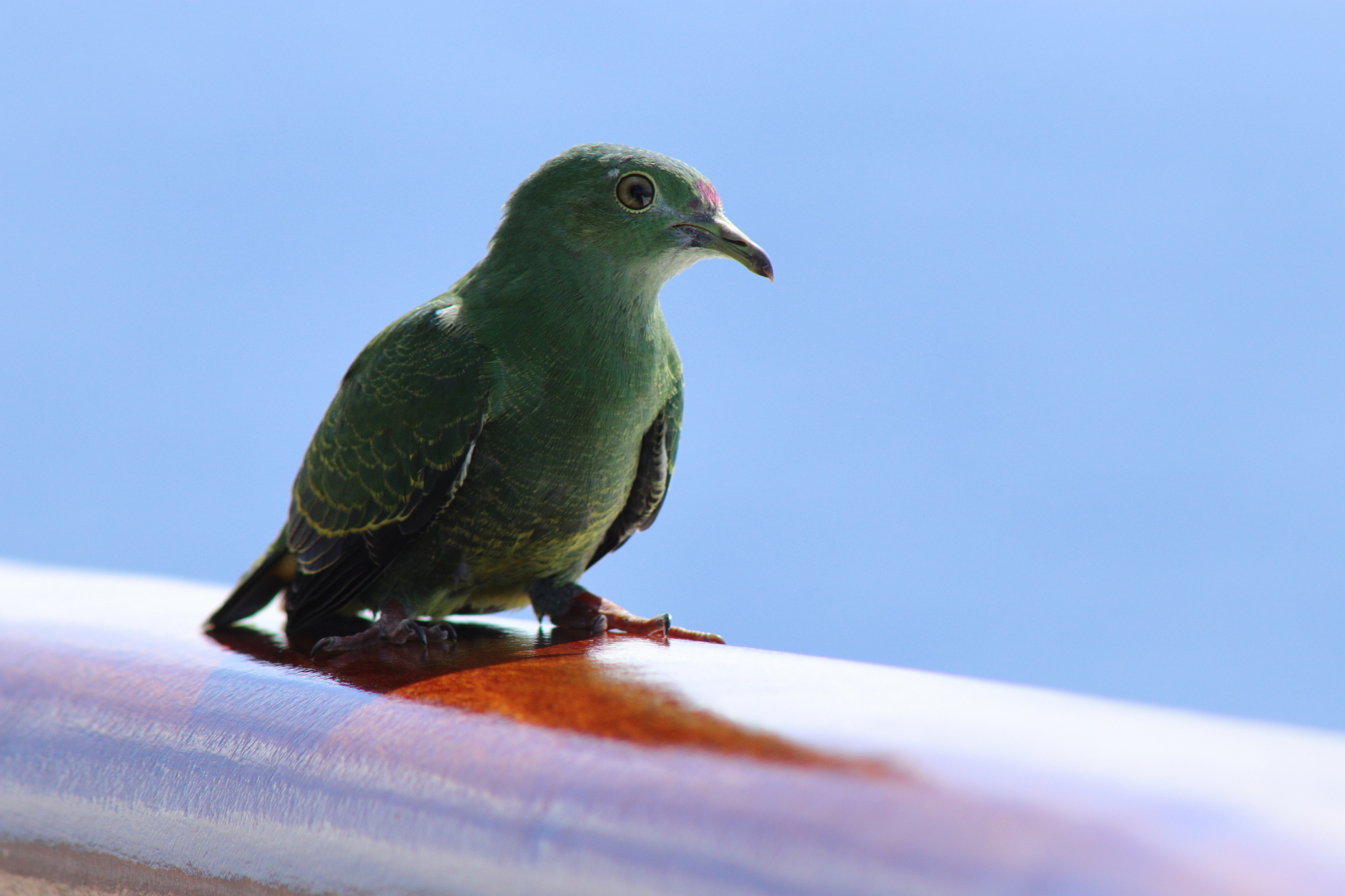

Conservation status
- Least Concern (IUCN 3.1)

Scientific classification
- Kingdom: Animalia
- Phylum: Chordata
- Class: Aves
- Order: Columbiformes
- Family: Columbidae
- Genus: Ptilinopus
- Species: P. solomonensis

Binomial name
- Ptilinopus solomonensis Gray, GR, 1870

= Yellow-bibbed fruit dove =

Species of bird

The yellow-bibbed fruit dove or yellow-banded fruit dove (Ptilinopus solomonensis) is a species of bird in the family Columbidae. It is found in the Bismarck and Solomon Islands archipelagos. The Geelvink fruit dove (P. speciosus) was formerly considered conspecific, but was split as a distinct species by the IOC in 2021.

Its natural habitat is subtropical or tropical moist lowland forests.
