= Emma's giant rat =

Emma's uromys

Conservation status
- Critically Endangered (IUCN 3.1)

Scientific classification
- Kingdom: Animalia
- Phylum: Chordata
- Class: Mammalia
- Order: Rodentia
- Family: Muridae
- Genus: Uromys
- Species: U. emmae

Binomial name
- Uromys emmae Groves and Flannery, 1994

Species of rodent

Emma's uromys or Emma's giant rat (Uromys emmae) is a species of rodent in the family Muridae. It is only known from Owi Island, a small island of about 1 square kilometer in area, located some 5 kilometres (3.1 mi) south of Biak Island, Indonesia.
