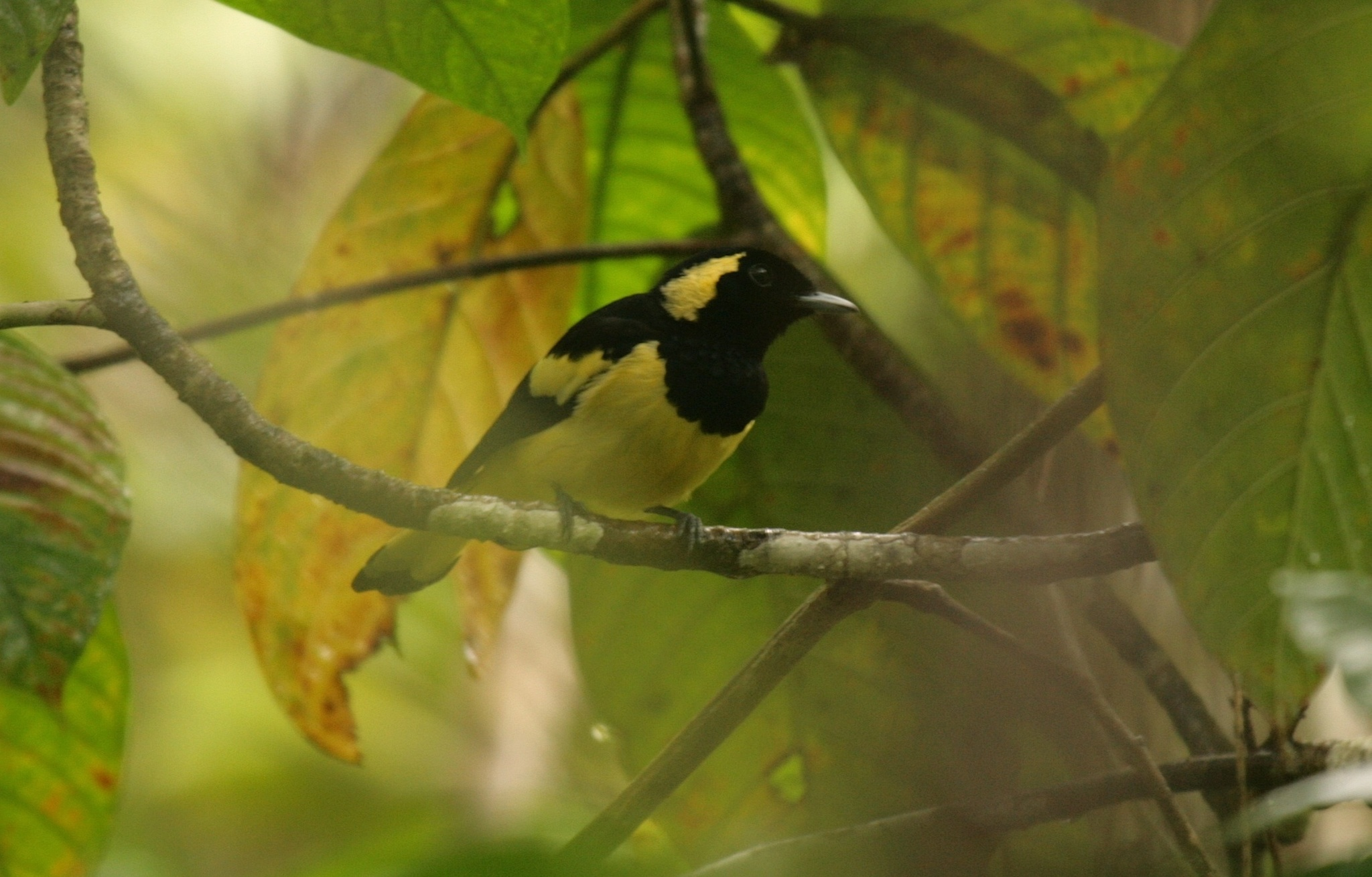

Conservation status
- Near Threatened (IUCN 3.1)

Scientific classification
- Kingdom: Animalia
- Phylum: Chordata
- Class: Aves
- Order: Passeriformes
- Family: Monarchidae
- Genus: Symposiachrus
- Species: S. brehmii

Binomial name
- Symposiachrus brehmii (Schlegel, 1871)

Synonyms
- Monarcha brehmii Schlegel, 1871

= Biak monarch =

Species of bird

The Biak monarch (Symposiachrus brehmii), or Biak monarch flycatcher, is a species of bird in the family Monarchidae. It is endemic to Biak Island, Indonesia.

Its natural habitat is subtropical or tropical moist lowland forests. It is threatened by habitat loss; the Biak monarch's habitat is affected by clearing forests for agricultural use and by logging. There are an estimated 2,500 to 9,999 adult birds of the species. If juvenile birds are included, the population may be between 3,500 and 15,000 individuals. Its population is decreasing. It is sometimes found in mixed flocks of small insectivores.

== Taxonomy and systematics ==
This species was originally placed in the genus Monarcha until moved to Symposiachrus in 2009.

== Description ==
The Biak monarch measures 17 cm (6.7 in). Its head, wings, throat, and central tail feathers are dark brown or black; its outer tail feathers, belly, breast, and rump are white. It also has a white patch on its wing. Some of the coloring may differ based on sex or age.
