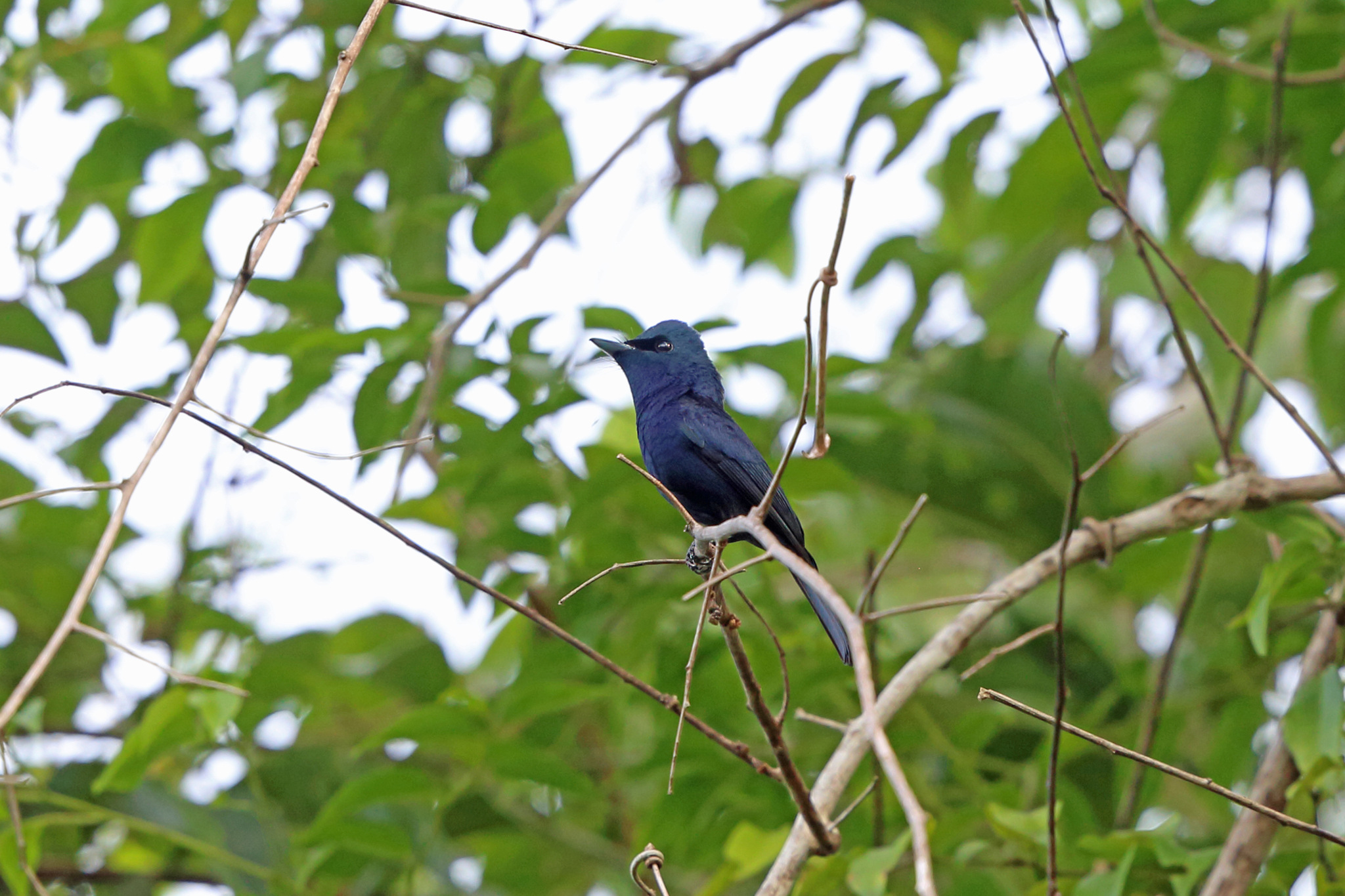

Conservation status
- Near Threatened (IUCN 3.1)

Scientific classification
- Kingdom: Animalia
- Phylum: Chordata
- Class: Aves
- Order: Passeriformes
- Family: Monarchidae
- Genus: Myiagra
- Species: M. atra

Binomial name
- Myiagra atra Meyer, 1874

= Biak black flycatcher =

Species of bird

The Biak black flycatcher or Biak flycatcher (Myiagra atra) is a species of bird in the family Monarchidae. It is endemic to Biak, Indonesia.

Its natural habitats are subtropical or tropical moist lowland forests and subtropical or tropical mangrove forests. It is threatened by habitat loss. Alternate names include Biak Myiagra, black flycatcher and black Myiagra flycatcher.
