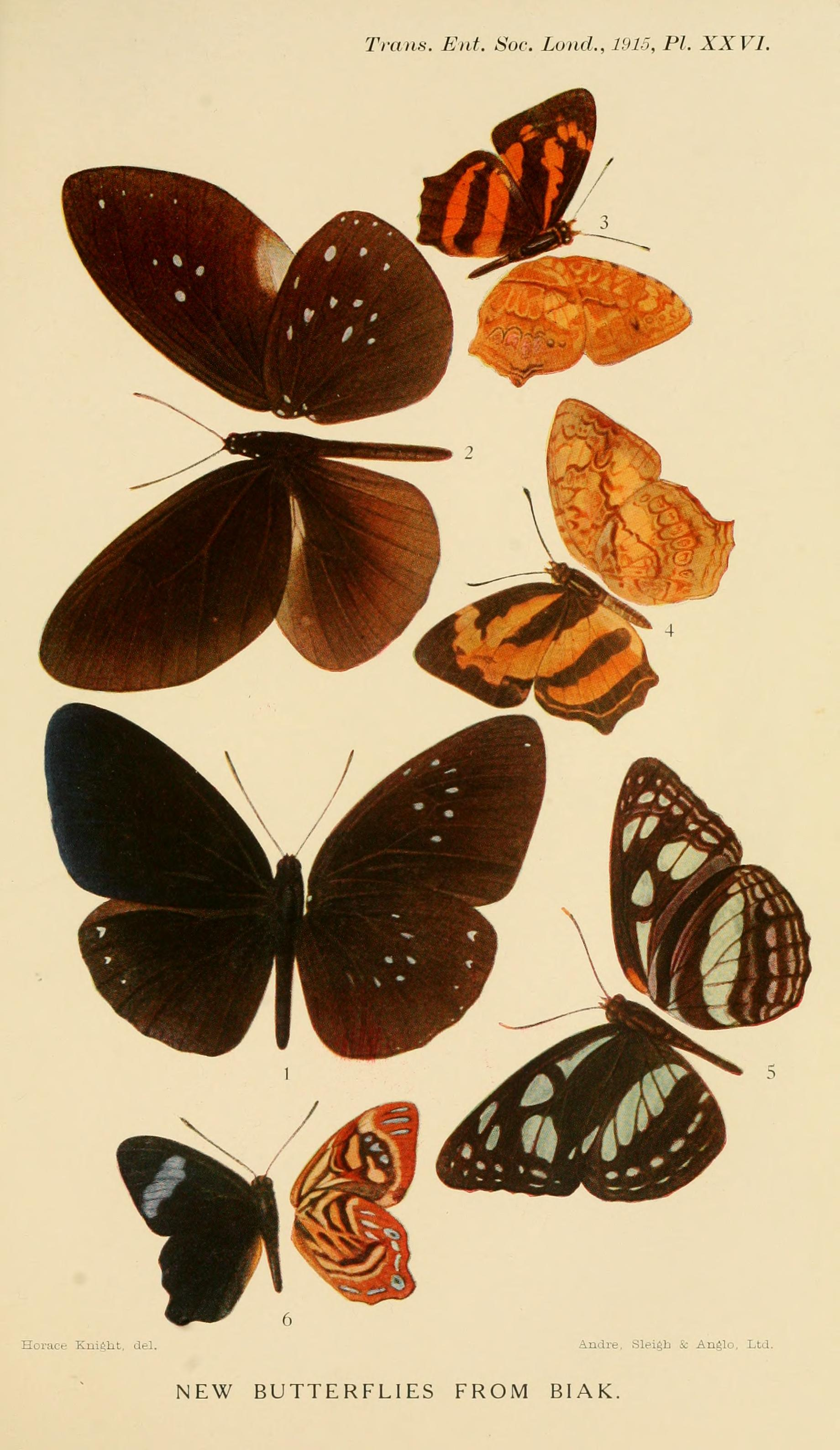

Conservation status
- Endangered (IUCN 2.3)

Scientific classification
- Kingdom: Animalia
- Phylum: Arthropoda
- Clade: Pancrustacea
- Class: Insecta
- Order: Lepidoptera
- Family: Nymphalidae
- Genus: Euploea
- Species: E. tripunctata

Binomial name
- Euploea tripunctata Joicey & Noakes, 1915

= Biak threespot crow =

Species of butterfly

The Biak threespot crow (Euploea tripunctata) is a species of nymphalid butterfly in the Danainae subfamily. It is endemic to Indonesia.
