= Biak giant rat =

Biak Island uromys

Conservation status
- Critically Endangered (IUCN 3.1)

Scientific classification
- Kingdom: Animalia
- Phylum: Chordata
- Class: Mammalia
- Order: Rodentia
- Family: Muridae
- Genus: Uromys
- Species: U. boeadii

Binomial name
- Uromys boeadii Groves and Flannery, 1994

Species of rodent

The Biak Island uromys or Biak giant rat (Uromys boeadii) is a species of rodent in the family Muridae. It is known only from a single specimen collected on the Indonesian island of Biak.
