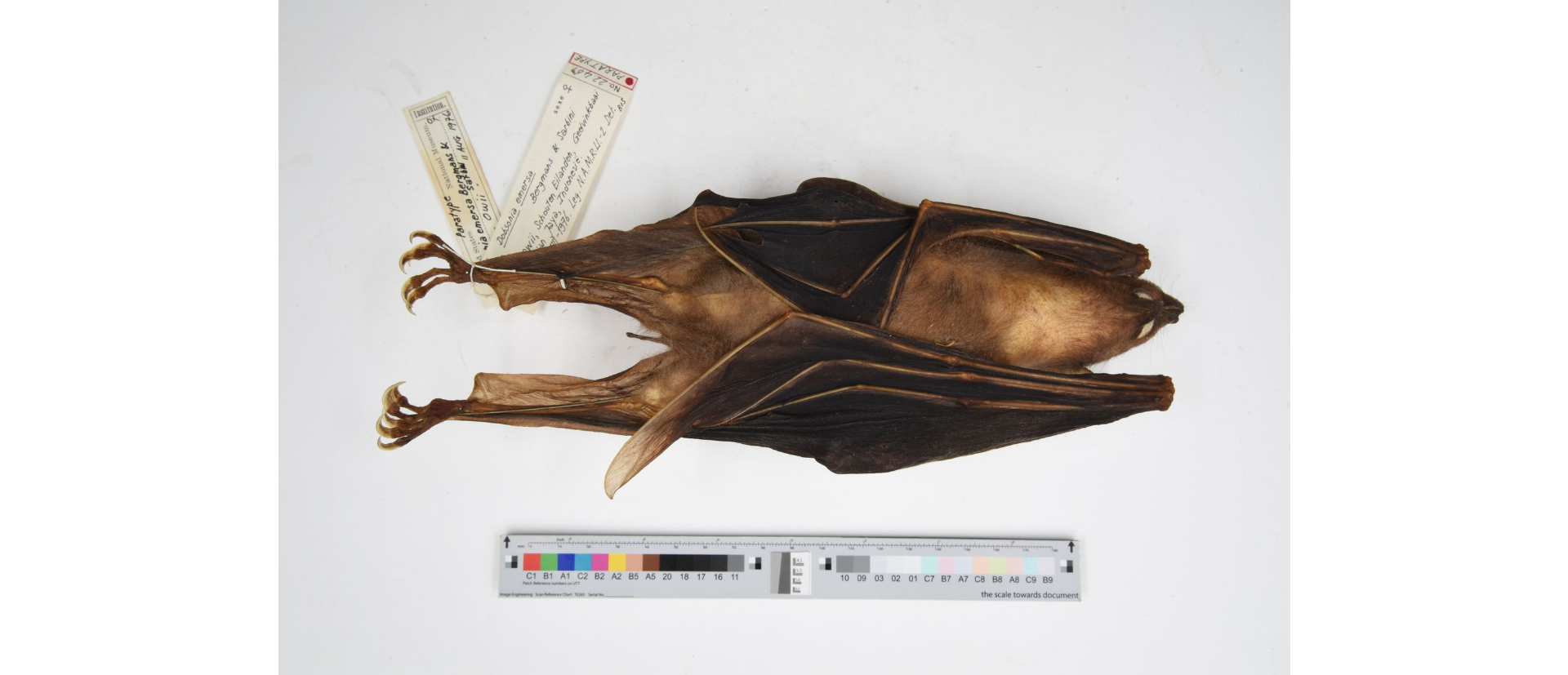

Conservation status
- Vulnerable (IUCN 3.1)

Scientific classification
- Kingdom: Animalia
- Phylum: Chordata
- Class: Mammalia
- Order: Chiroptera
- Family: Pteropodidae
- Genus: Dobsonia
- Species: D. emersa

Binomial name
- Dobsonia emersa Bergmans & Sarbini, 1985
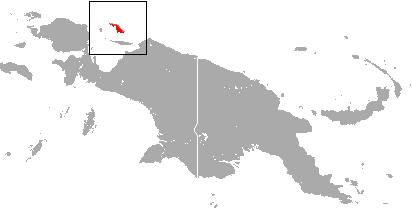
- Biak naked-backed fruit bat range

= Biak naked-backed fruit bat =

Species of bat

The Biak naked-backed fruit bat (Dobsonia emersa) is a species of megabat in the family Pteropodidae. It is endemic to Indonesia.

== Taxonomy and etymology ==
The Biak naked-backed fruit bat was first described as a species in 1985. Its species name "emersa" is from Latin "emergere," meaning "to emerge." Bergmans and Sarbini selected this name because zoologists such as Fredericus Anna Jentink had written about Dobsonia species from this area long ago, but had overlooked this taxon.

== Description ==
It has a curved snout and relatively large eyes. Its teeth are small and narrow. Adults have a forearm length of approximately 114 mm (4.5 in) and weigh 169–180 g (6.0–6.3 oz).

== Range and status ==
It is endemic to Indonesia. It is a lowland species, found at 0–30 m (0–98 ft) above sea level. It occupies both primary and secondary forests.

As of 2020, it is evaluated as a vulnerable species by the IUCN. It is susceptible to population decline via overhunting and disturbance of its roost sites.
