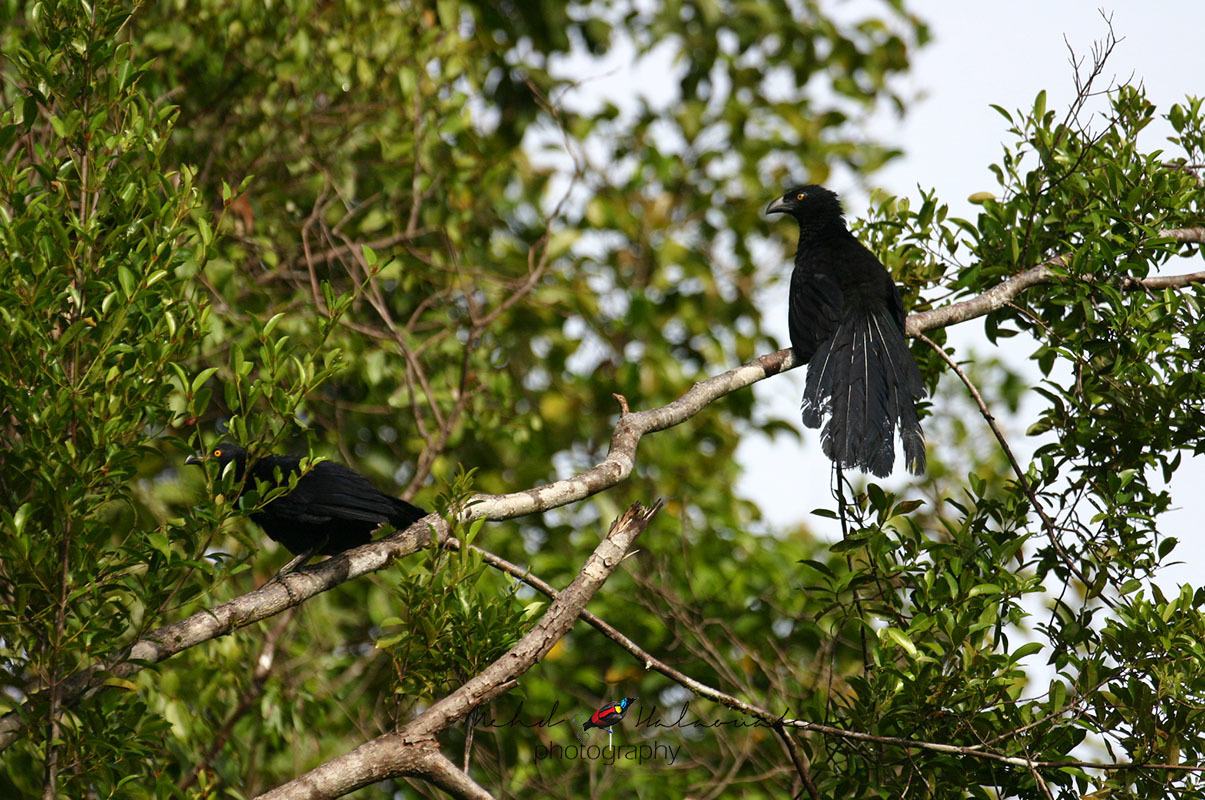

Conservation status
- Near Threatened (IUCN 3.1)

Scientific classification
- Kingdom: Animalia
- Phylum: Chordata
- Class: Aves
- Order: Cuculiformes
- Family: Cuculidae
- Genus: Centropus
- Species: C. chalybeus

Binomial name
- Centropus chalybeus (Salvadori, 1876)

= Biak coucal =

Species of bird

The Biak coucal (Centropus chalybeus) is a species of cuckoo in the family Cuculidae. It is endemic to West Papua, Indonesia.

Its natural habitat is subtropical or tropical moist lowland forest. It is threatened by habitat loss.
