= Numfor =

Indonesian island off the northern coast of Papua New Guinea

- Location within Papua (province)

Geography
- Location: Melanesia; Maritime South East Asia
- Coordinates: 1.03°S 134.88°E
- Archipelago: Schouten Islands
- Area: 335 km^{2} (129 sq mi)

Administration
- Indonesia
- Province: Papua
- Regency: Biak Numfor

Demographics
- Population: 9,336 (2010)

Additional information
- Time zone: IEST (UTC+09:00)

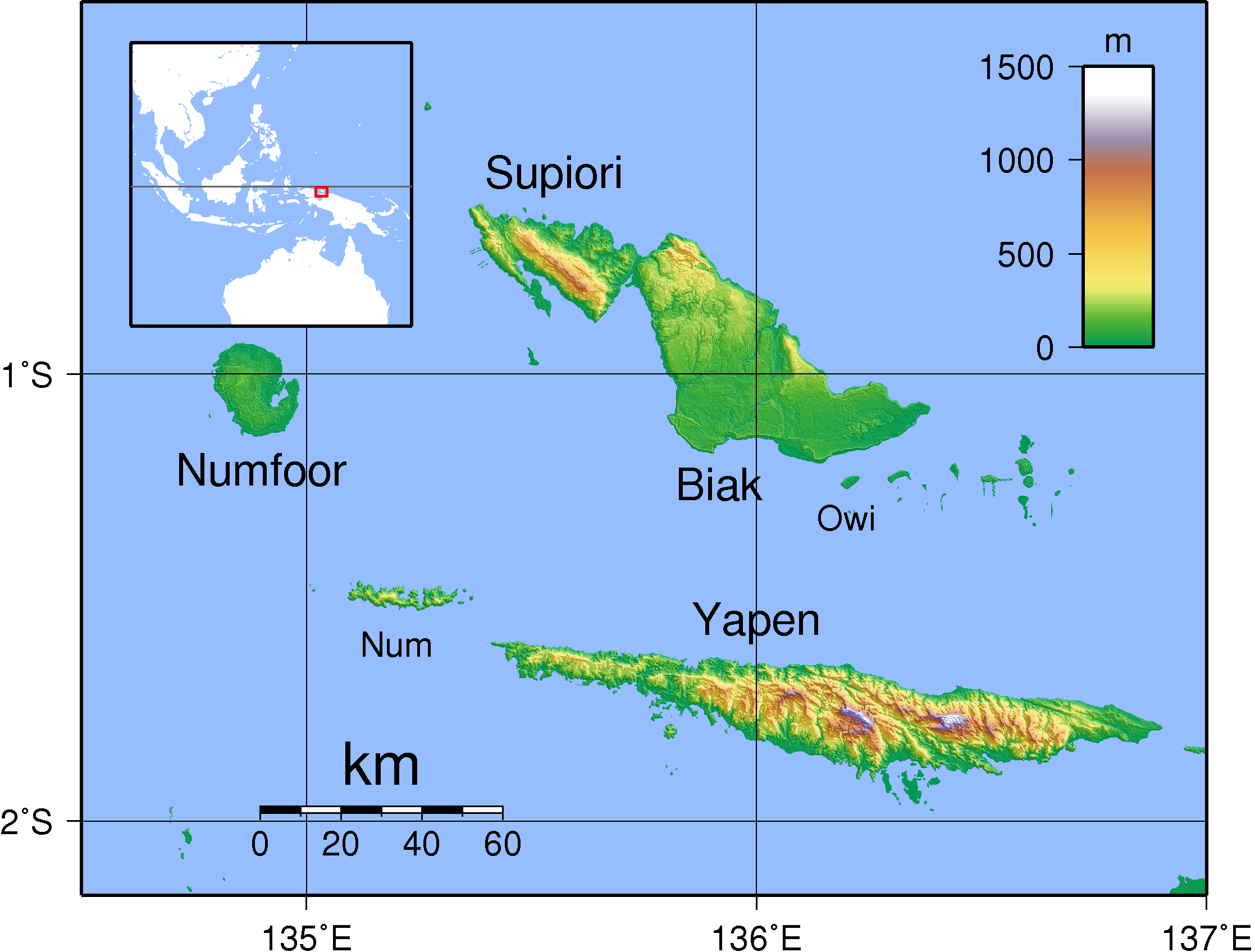
Numfor as one of the Schouten Islands

Numfor (also Numfoor, Noemfoor, Noemfoer) is one of the Biak Islands (also known as the Schouten Islands) in Papua province, northeastern Indonesia.

It was the site of conflict between Japanese and the Allied forces during World War II, and was a major airbase for both sides.

== Geography ==
The island is located on the northern side of large Cenderawasih Bay (formerly Geelvink Bay) of New Guinea island. Approximately oval shaped, it has an area of 335 square kilometres (129 sq mi). It is mostly surrounded by coral reefs, with the exception of some points on the southeastern coast. Also found on the southeastern coast are low, steep cliffs. Most of the interior is composed of forest.

The island is jurisdictionally within the Biak Numfor Regency of Papua province. It has a population of 9,336 people in the 2010 census covering 5 districts.

== History ==
The first sighting by Europeans was by the Spanish navigator Álvaro de Saavedra on 24 June 1528 when he was trying to return from Tidore to New Spain. Another sighting was later reported in 1545 by Spanish navigator Íñigo Ortiz de Retes on board of galleon San Juan when also attempting the return to New Spain

The Tidore Sultanate had tributary ties with the island. Seafarers from the region used to regularly pay homage to the sultan.

=== World War II ===
During World War II, Numfor was occupied by Japanese military forces in December 1943. The indigenous population at the time numbered about 5,000 people, most of whom lived a subsistence lifestyle in coastal villages.

The island was also hosting about 1,100 laborers taken to Numfor by the Japanese: 600 members of a Formosan (Taiwanese) auxiliary labor unit and 500 Indonesian civilian forced laborers. These were the survivors of more than 4,000 laborers taken to Numfor by the Japanese.

The Japanese built three airfields on the island, turning it into a significant air base.

- Kornasoren Airfield/Yebrurro Airfield, located toward the northern end of the island
- Kameri Airfield, on the northwestern edge of the island
- Namber Airfield, on the west coast of the island.

Bombing of the island by United States and Australian aircraft began as early as April 1944.

Allied units landed on the island, from July 2, 1944. Although the island is surrounded by "an almost solid ring" of coral, newspapers reported "almost no loss" of troops in reaching the shore. Troops initially landed around Kamiri Airfield on the northwest edge of the island. Although there were extensive Japanese defensive preparations in the Kamiri area, there was little resistance at Kamiri Airfield. In the words of the US Navy official history: "Japanese encountered around the airfield were so stunned from the effects of the bombardment that all the fight was taken out of them."

The following day, as a precaution against Japanese resistance elsewhere, 2,000 US paratroopers from the 503 Parachute Infantry Regiment were dropped onto the island. The second base captured by US forces, Yebrurro Airfield, was secured by 4 July 1944.

On July 5, there was an unsuccessful Japanese counter-attack. That same day, a detachment of US forces from Numfor also secured the smaller neighboring island of Manim. Namber Airfield came under Allied control, without resistance, on July 6. The island was officially declared secure on July 7. However, individual Japanese soldiers continued guerrilla activities, and it was August 31 before all fighting had ceased.

By August 31, the Allies had lost 66 killed or missing and 343 wounded. It had killed approximately 1,714 Japanese and taken 186 prisoners.

According to the US Army official history, only 403 of the original 3,000 Javanese civilian laborers were alive by August 31. About 10-15 were reported to have been killed accidentally by Allied forces. The rest had died from maltreatment before the invasion.

About 300 Formosan labor troops had died before the invasion. Others fought the Allies, allegedly as a result of Japanese coercion. Over 550 surrendered; more than half of these were suffering from starvation and tropical diseases. Less than 20 were reported killed by Allied action.

According to the US Army historian, Allied personnel found evidence that human bodies, of Japanese, Formosan and Allied personnel, had been partly eaten by starving Japanese and Formosans.

The air base was used in a series of five air raids on the oil refineries of Japanese-occupied Balikpapan which were supplying up to 35% of Japan's refined petroleum products. Balikpapan only came within extreme range of the B-24 Liberator bombers of the 13th and 5th US Air Forces. The first air raid on September 30, 1944 was led by Colonel Thomas Cebern Musgrave Jr.. A second raid occurred three days later. Without fighter cover, the first two raids suffered severe losses. Three more raids in October were escorted by P-38 Lightning and P-47 Thunderbolt fighters flying from new bases at Morotai and Sansapor.
