= Padaido Islands =

Archipelago north of New Guinea

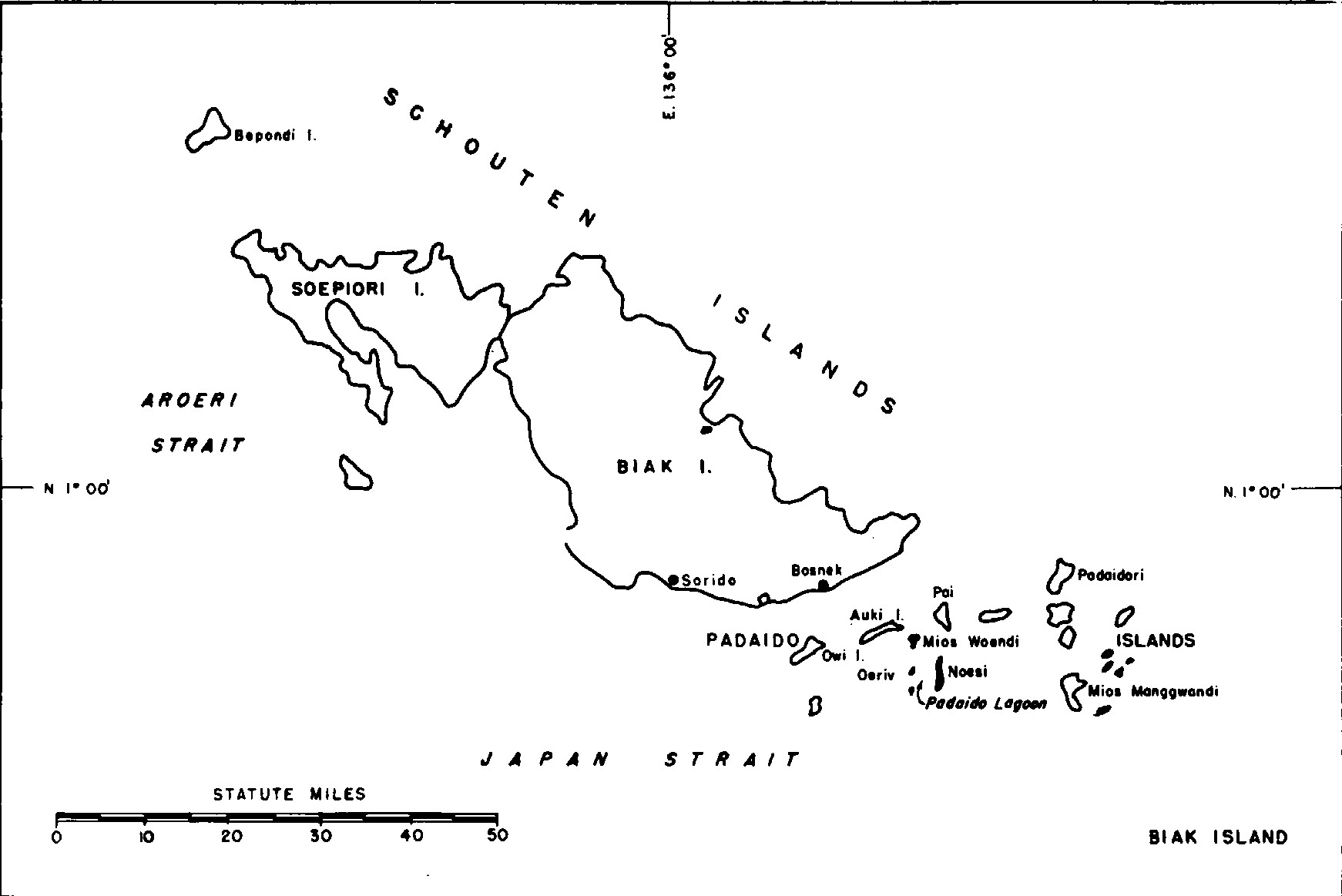
Padaido Islands are southeast of the island of Biak

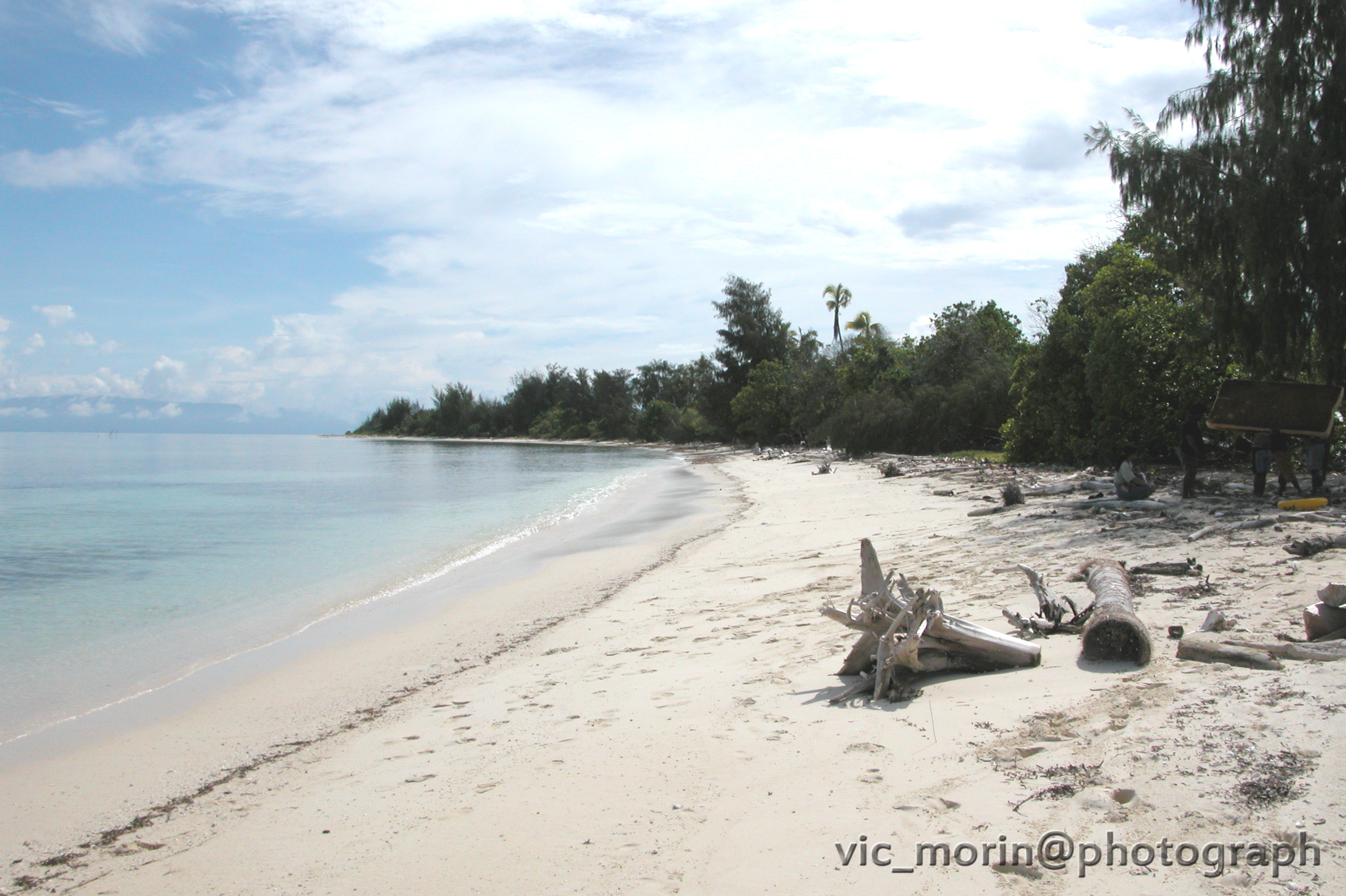
Nusi Island

The Padaido Islands, also known as the Padaido Archipelago, is a group of Islands in Indonesia's Papua Province. They lie in Cenderawasih Bay, south and southeast of the island of Biak. The archipelago consists of many small islands and coral reefs.

== Geography ==
The Padaido Islands lie between 1°07’ and 1°22’ South Latitude, and 136°10’ and 136°46’ East Longitude. The archipelago consists of 29 islands. Owi lies furthest west. Auki, Pai, Mios Woendi, and Nusi islands are part of the extensive Woendi atoll, contained within a fringing coral reef, which comprise the Padaido District within the Regency. Pekreki Island lies west of the atoll. An eastern group of islands forming the Almando Padaido District includes Padaidori, Bromsi, Pasi, Manggwandi, Workbondi, Insamfursi, Samakur, Dauwi, Wamsor, Runi and other small islands and reefs.

The islands are generally low, and composed of sand, limestone, or sandstone.

Nine of the islands are inhabited. The residents mostly work as fishers, catching tuna and reef fish. Most fishers use traditional methods such as hook-and-line and nets. Some employ means like poisoning and dynamite fishing, which damage the coral reefs and plants and animals that live there.

Politically the islands are part of Biak Numfor Regency.

== Ecology ==
The islands are in the Coral Triangle, which has the greatest diversity of coral reef species. Marine environments include extensive areas of coral reef and seagrass beds, and smaller areas of mangrove swamp, particularly on Padaidori.

The islands have a wet tropical climate. Many of the islands are forested. Beach forests occur on most of the islands. Several islands have groves of coconut palms, and some of the larger islands have areas of lowland tropical forest growing on limestone substrates. Some beach forests are composed mostly of Casuarina, while others have a mix of species including the trees and shrubs Barringtonia asiatica, Pandanus tectorius, Hibiscus tiliaceus, Casuarina, Scaevola frutescens, and Terminalia catappa. Crinum asiaticum and the parasitic plant Cassytha filiformis are found the beach forest understory.

== Padaido Marine Recreation Park ==
Padaido Marine Recreation Park, established in 2009, encompasses the islands and the sea around them.
