= Supiori Island =

Indonesian island off the northern coast of Papua New Guinea

Supiori

Geography
- Location: Melanesia; Oceania
- Coordinates: 0°45′S 135°30′E
- Archipelago: Schouten Islands
- Area: 514.49 km^{2} (198.65 sq mi)
- Highest elevation: 1,034 m (3392 ft)

Administration
- Indonesia
- Province: Papua
- Regency: Supiori

Demographics
- Population: 17,048 (2020 Census)
- Pop. density: 33/km^{2} (85/sq mi)

Additional information
- Time zone: Indonesia Eastern Standard Time (UTC+09:00)

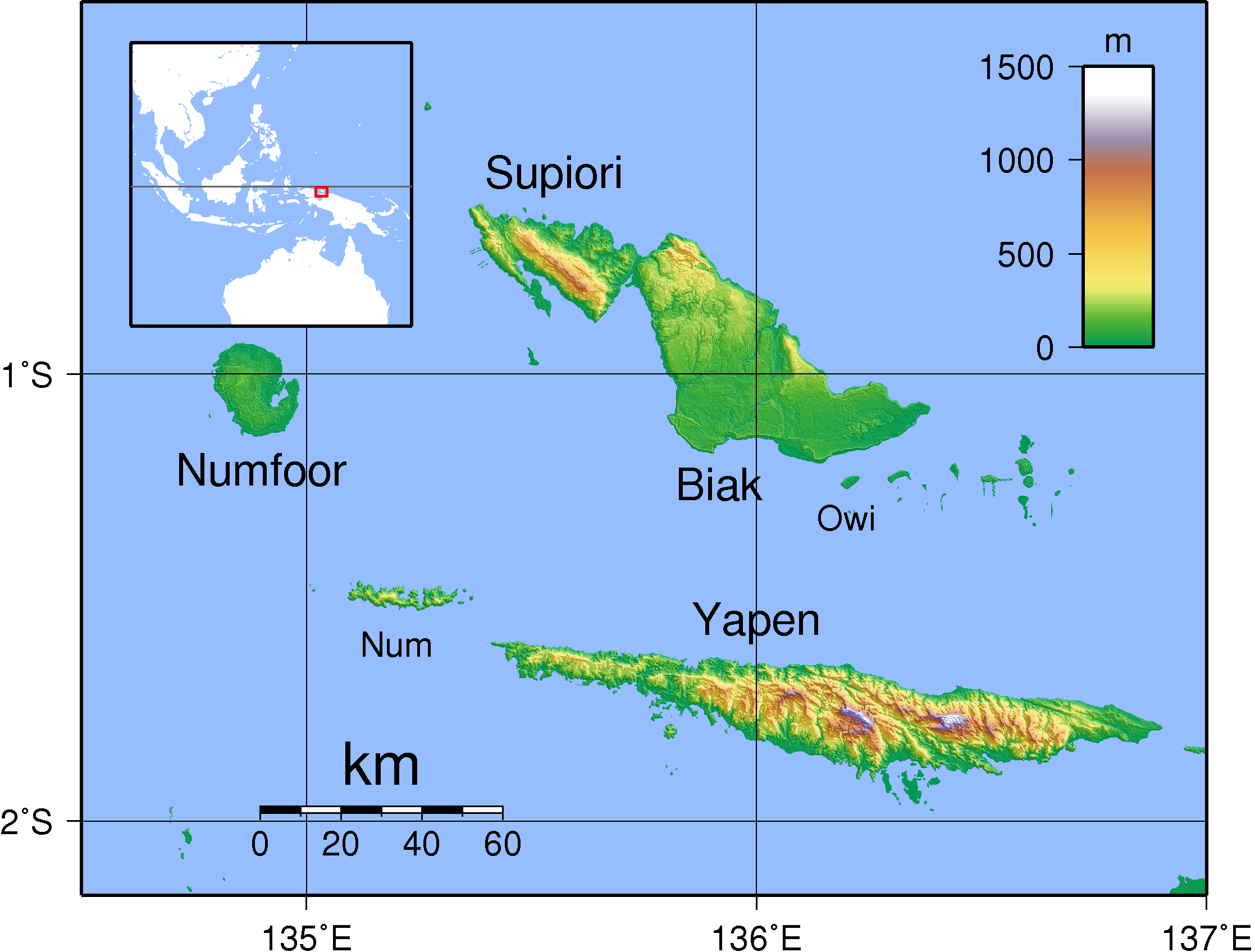
Supiori as one of the Schouten Islands

Supiori is an island of the Schouten Islands archipelago in Cenderawasih Bay, just west of Biak island in Papua Province, Western New Guinea, northeastern Indonesia.

== Description ==
The island has a rugged terrain, largely covered in tropical rainforest. It is about forty kilometres (25 miles) long and 25 km (16 mi) wide, covering a total area of 514.49 square kilometres (199 square miles) (including small offshore islands such as Rani but excluding the neighbouring Aruri Archipelago. Its highest point is 1,034 metres (3,392 ft) in elevation.

Principal settlements include Korido on the south coast and Yenggarbun on the north coast. South of Supiori lie the small coral islands Aruri (Insumbabi) and Rani. Before 1963, the island was part of the colonial Netherlands New Guinea. It comprises Supiori Regency within Papua Province.

== History ==
The island was first sighted by Europeans by the Portuguese Jorge de Menezes in 1526. Menezes landed at Biak Islands, where he was forced to winter. One of the first sightings was also made by the Spanish navigator Álvaro de Saavedra on 24 June 1528, when trying to return from Tidore to New Spain. The Schoutens were charted as Islas de Oro (Golden Islands in Spanish).

Its sighting was again reported by Spanish navigator Íñigo Órtiz de Retes in 1545. It was charted as Los Martires by the Spaniards, possibly because it was where Spanish navigator Hernando de Grijalva was murdered by his mutinied crew.
