= Biak =

Indonesian island off the northern coast of Papua

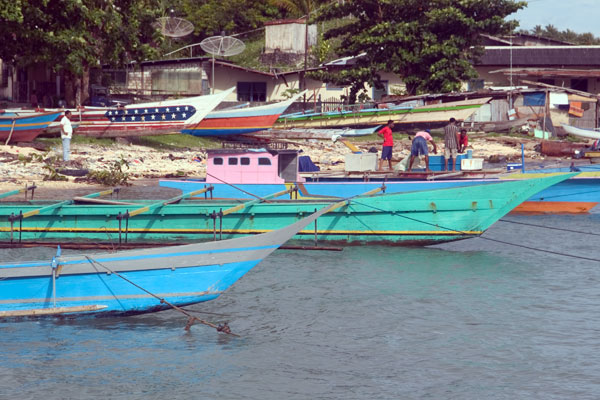
- Fishing boats lined up at Kota Biak, Indonesia.

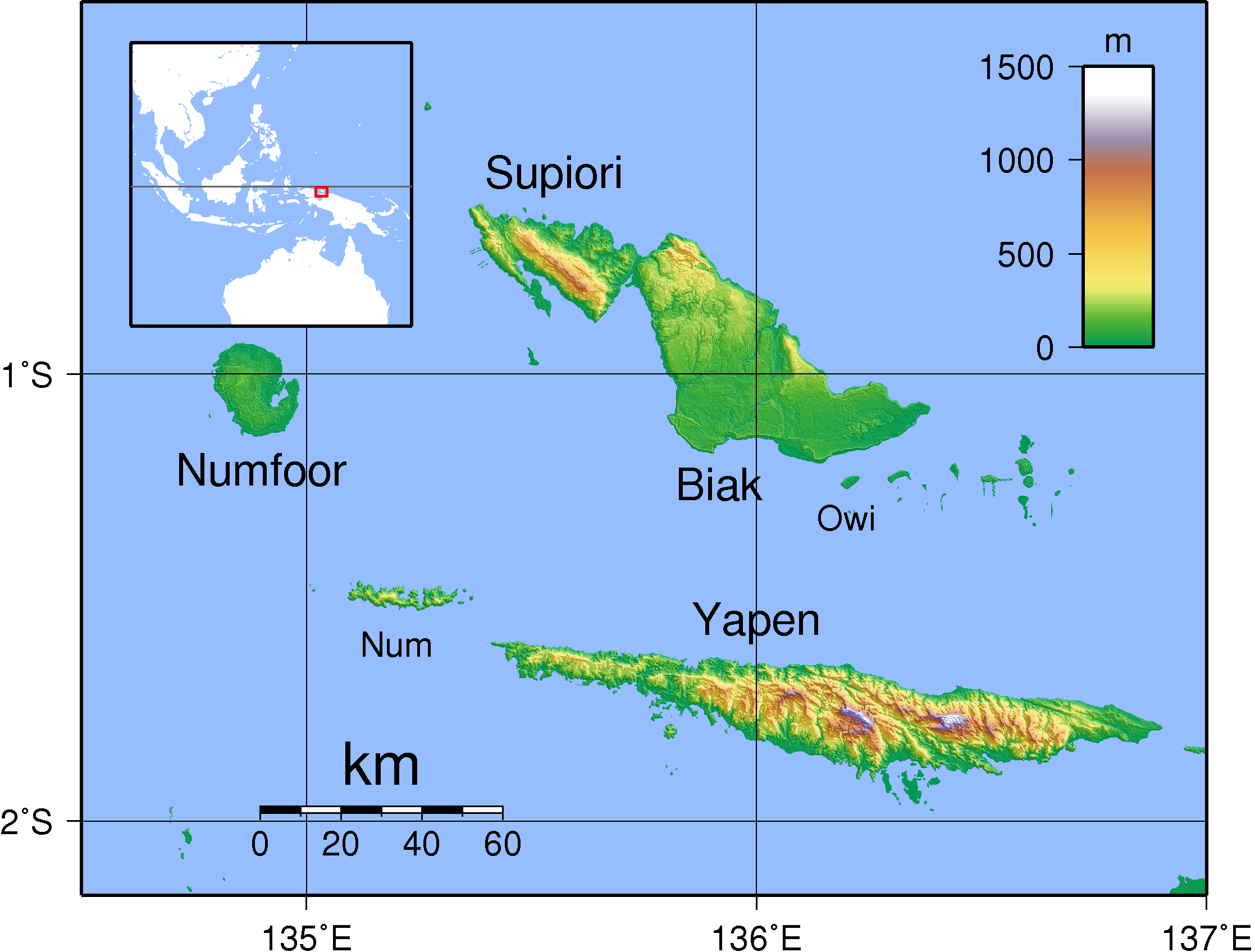
- Biak as one of the Biak Islands

- Location within Pacific Ocean Location within Southeast Asia Location within Papua (province)

Geography
- Location: Melanesia; Oceania
- Coordinates: 1°0′0″S 136°0′0″E
- Archipelago: Biak Archipelago
- Area: 2,455 km^{2} (948 sq mi)

Administration
- Indonesia
- Province: Papua
- Regency: Biak Numfor
- Largest settlement: Kota Biak

Demographics
- Population: 122,166 (2020)

Biak is the main island of Biak Archipelago located in Cenderawasih Bay near the northern coast of Papua, an Indonesian province, and is just northwest of New Guinea. Biak has many atolls, reefs, and corals. In the older literature the island was also called Mysore Island.

The largest population centre is at Kota Biak (Biak City) on the south coast. The rest of the island is thinly populated with small villages.

Biak is part of the Biak Islands (Kepulauan Biak), and is administered by Biak Numfor Regency.

== Geography ==
Biak covers an area of 2,455 km^{2} (948 sq mi) The island is 72 km (45 mi) long and 37 km (23 mi) wide at its widest point. The highest point is approximately 740 meters elevation, located in the northwest of the island.

The island of Supiori lies close to the northwest, separated from Biak by a narrow, shallow channel called the Sorendi River, running between Sorendiweri Bay in the north and Sorendidori Bay in the south. The smaller Padaido Islands lie south and southeast of Biak.

Collectively Biak, Supiori, the Padaido Islands, and the island of Numfor to the southwest are known as the Schouten Islands, also called the Biak Islands or Geelvink Islands. Biak is the largest island in the group, and the most populated. The islands enclose Cenderawasih Bay on the north. The island of Yapen lies south of Biak and the Padaido Islands, separated by a broad channel.

The island is administered by Biak Numfor Regency, which also includes Numfor and the Padaido Islands. The administrative center is at Biak City. Supiori was formerly part of Biak Numfor Regency, but was made a separate regency in 2004.

== History ==
Biak was first sighted by Europeans by the Portuguese navigator Jorge de Menezes in 1526. In his voyage from Malacca to Maluku via northern Borneo, Jorge de Menezes landed at Biak Islands, at the entrance of the Gulf, where he was forced to winter; the island is thenceforth called in Portuguese maps Ilha de Dom Jorge or Ilha onde invernou Dom Jorge, to become, finally, Ilha de S. Jorge.

The Spanish navigator Álvaro de Saavedra sighted the island on 24 June 1528, when trying to return from Tidore to New Spain. Another sighting was later reported in 1545 by Spanish navigator Íñigo Ortiz de Retes on board of galleon San Juan when also attempting the return to New Spain

The archipelago was first mapped in the Portuguese charts of Gaspar Viegas (c. 1537), an anonymous map of 1540, and on the maps of João de Lisboa and of Bartolomeu Velho (c. 1560), and by other Portuguese, Spanish, and Dutch maps.

In World War II, a strategic airfield of the Imperial Japanese Army was located there, serving as a base for operations in the Pacific theatre. American forces eventually captured the island during the Battle of Biak. The captured airfield was renamed Mokmer Airfield and later transferred to the Royal Australian Air Force. Biak became the second landing of allied forces after Hollandia. Many Biak islanders received supplies from allied forces such as clothes and foods.

To restore their rule after the war, the Dutch reopened schools and re-employed graduates from teacher schools in Miei. Some Biak islanders including Frans Kaisieppo, Eduard Rumbrar, Markus Kaisiepo, Marttinus Rumayau, and Lukas Rumkorem were educated in Bestuur schools. By September 1945, Lukas Rumkorem founded Perserikatan Indonesia Merdeka (PIM), the first political party in Biak which held meetings during September and November in Nusi and from January 1946 in Bosnek. Although Rumkorem's activity would be found out by Hoofd Plaatselik Bestuur (HPB), no further action would be taken as the HPB went on sick leave until the resident found out. By the middle of 1947, Lukas Rumkorem would be captured by Dutch authority accused of trying to kill Frans Kaisiepo and Marcus Kaisiepo. De Bruijn as district leader of Biak would reorganised and formed regional council Kakain Karkara on 20 November 1947 to rebuild villages which were destroyed after Koreri movements against social changes brought by outsiders.

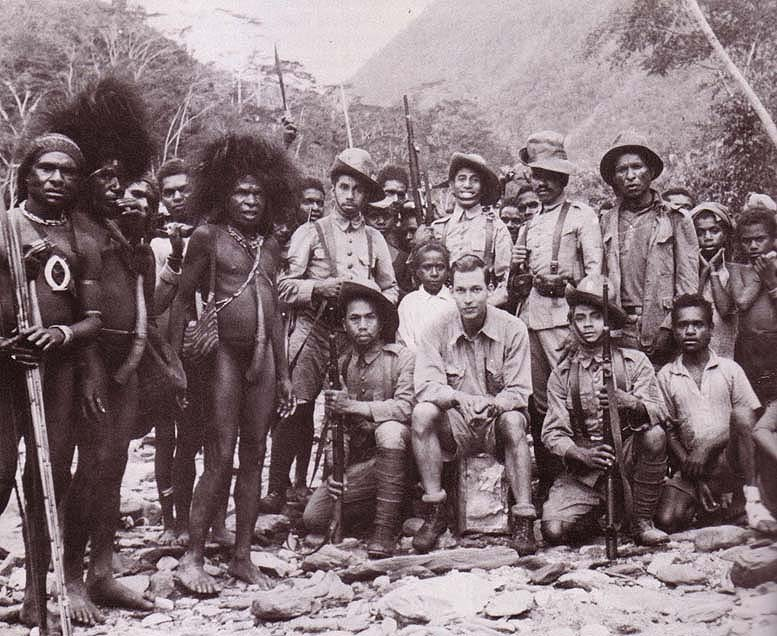
de Bruijn and his team during Operation Oaktree in Paniai

In his administration de Bruijn had a right hand man by the name of Stefanus Yoseph which was formerly under the employ of Japanese and met de Bruijn during his employment in Wissel Lakes (Paniai) during Operation Oaktree, Stefanus Yoseph was entrusted as warden in Biak, during which he stayed with Petero Jandi a Makassarese working as woodworker in HPB office. According to Stefanus, Petero Jandi was an Indonesian nationalist extremist (with links with Polongbangkeng group from South Sulawesi) which was captured and exiled to Biak. When Solait the bestuurassistent was on holiday in Ambon, Stefanus was chosen as bestuurassistent. During this time they supported two prisoners, Hermanus Rumere and Ambonese named Watti which led an attack on ammunition depot and Biak prison on 14 March 1948. Another important figure in this rebellion was Hanoch Rumbrar a clerk in HPB office, which became the intermediary between civilians and Petero Jandi's movement in garnering support and campaign from January to 10 March to become part of 'Sukarno's Republic'. They gained some support however some rejected not because they were pro-Dutch but afraid of similar retaliation during Manseren incident (1942-1943). This movement also tried to coordinate with Silas Papare's PKII particularly with Saleh, Ratulangi's exiled assistant in Serui. A week before this rebellion de Bruijn was on official travel. The plan was to attack KNIL garrison in Sorido followed with attack to central radio station and KNIL military post in Boruku field and Mokmer to gain weapons and free prisoners in Serui before invading Manokwari and Sorong. The rebellion did not go to plan and led to shootouts as one of local Biak youth, Terrianus shot Dutch Sergeant Schipper. By Monday, Stefanus Yoseph was captured, followed by Petero Jandi, Hanoch Rumbrar, and others the next day. Around 40 rebels would be captured and brought to Cipinang prison in Jakarta and released in the 1950s. Petero Jandi would receive capital punishment in Hollandia while others holdouts in jungle, like Petrus Korwa and Hanoch Rumbrar were sent to Digul.

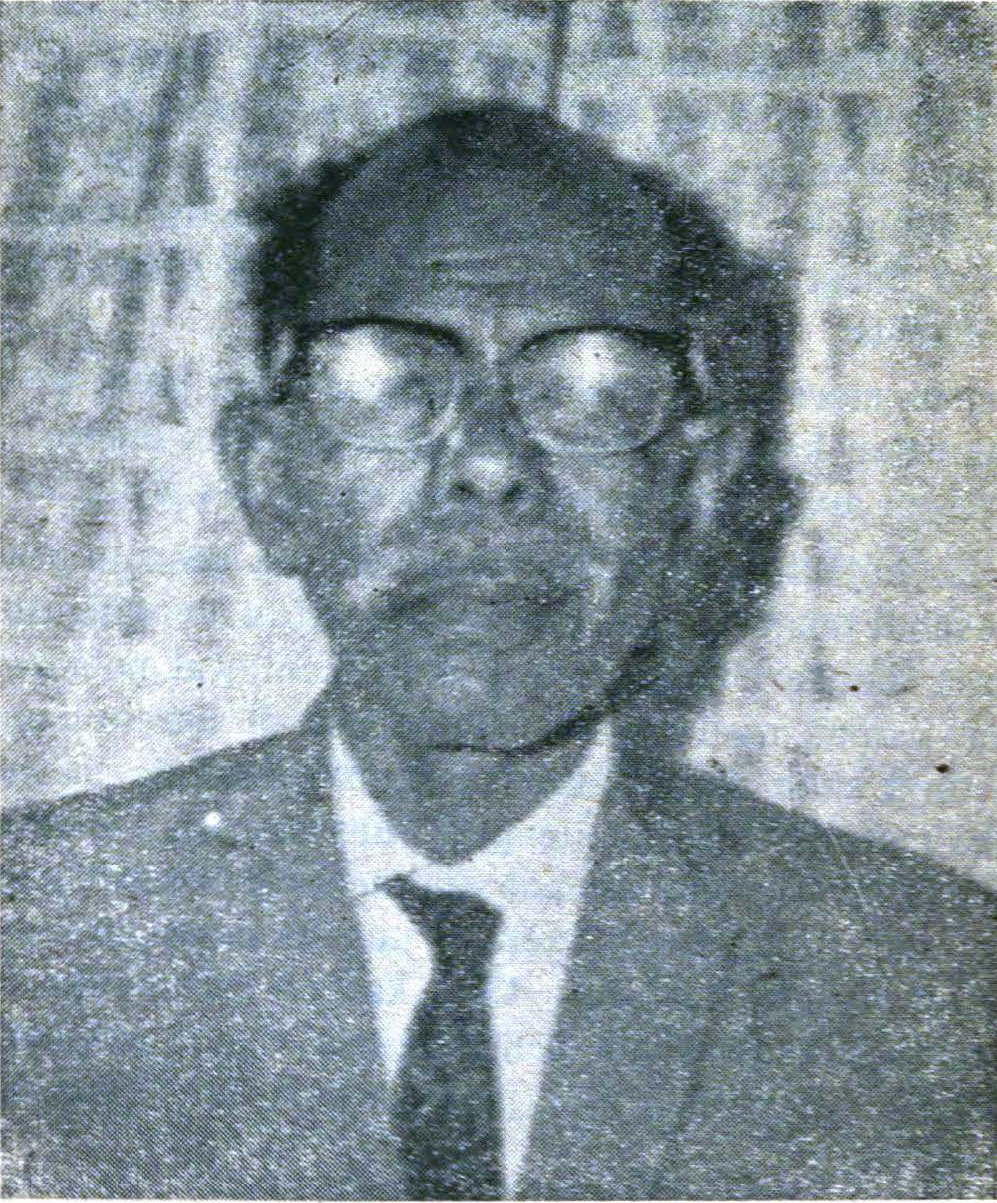
Lukas Rumkorem

PIM activities would resume after the arrival of Corinus Krey from Hollandia on 7 August 1949. On 1 October 1949, there would be a meeting in the home of Yenures village leader, David Rumaropen to reorganise PIM and formally reactivated on 5 October 1949 in Bosnik, in the home of Lukas Rumkorem, with him as leader, Corinus Krey as deputy and J. Tarumaselly as advisor and Petrus Warikar as secretary. By 1958, a new movement led by Lukas Rumkorem was formed called Tentara Tjadangan Tjenderawasih (TTT), which according to J. Tarumaselly had branches in other region of Papua. This organisation sent some papuan youths to undergo military training outside Biak which was planned to guide Indonesia infiltration forces. TTT also made contacts with Indonesia Consulate General in Singapore to utilise Chinese-Indonesian as they move more freely with KPM ships other activities include surveillance of potential important locations in Biak by J. Tarumaselly and T. Rumngeur which was sent to Indonesian representatives in Singapore, Ambon, Hollandia, and Serui. TTT activities would be stopped after Dutch authorities found out and captured David Woisiri, Rafael Maselkosu, J. Tarumaselly, Jonathan Saroy, and Frits Werluken member of TTT branch of Serui.

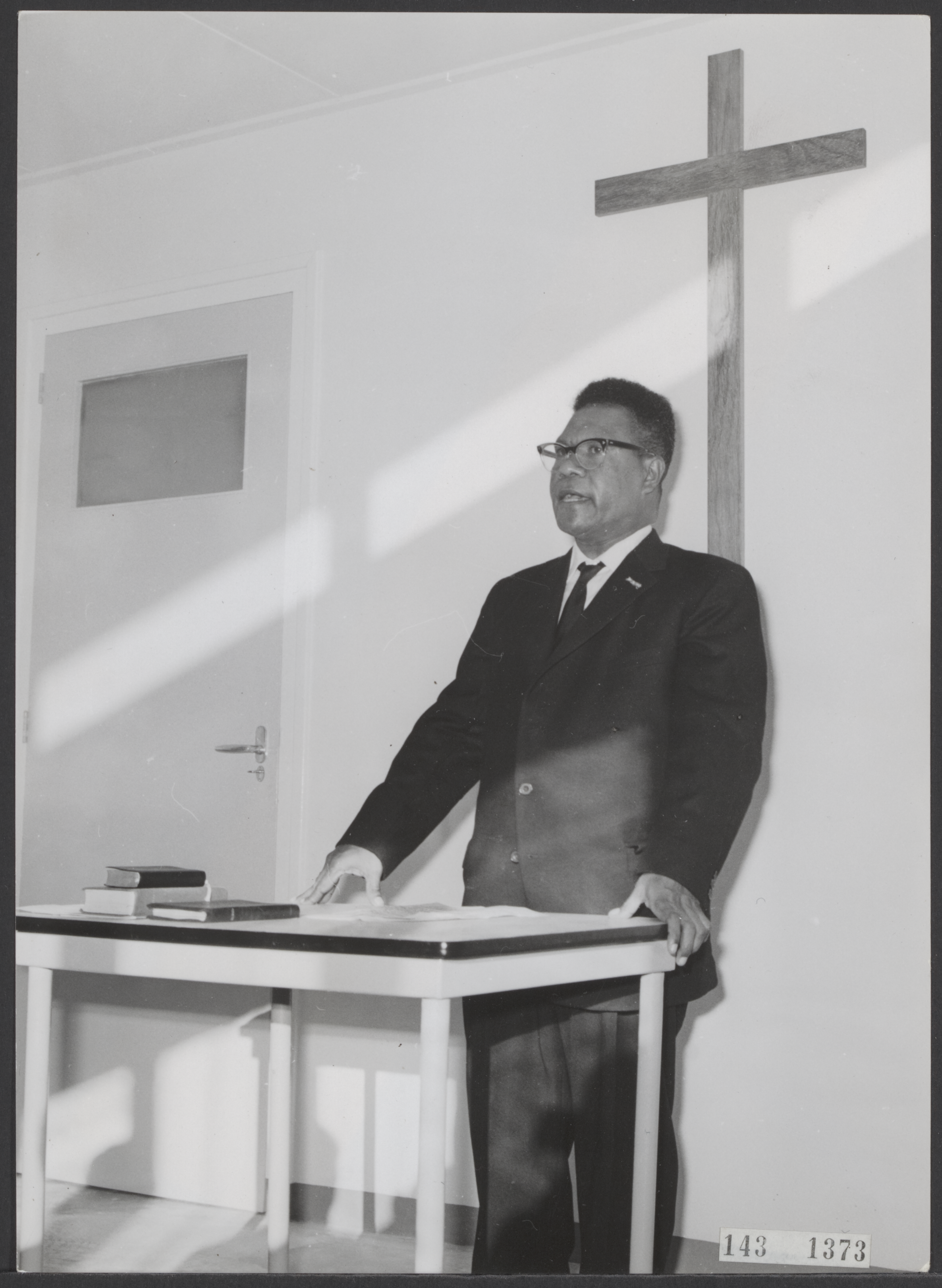
Ds. F.J.S. Rumainum giving a sermon

It was transferred from Dutch rule, along with half of New Guinea, to Indonesia in the 1960s. On 15 August 1962, New York Agreement was signed, which contained provision for Penentuan Pendapat Rakyat. From 29 September to 19 October 1962, there was a papuan delegations consisting of 19 members to visit Indonesian regions and meet with Sukarno in Jakarta. Another delegations from papuan regions consisted of 34 people declare their oaths for Indonesia, among these Biak sent 2 delegates, Ds. F.J.S. Rumainum and Frans Kaisiepo. Another declaration from education employees delegates consisted of 16 people with Biak represented by L. Mandibodibo and N. Urbinas.

On 1 July 1998, the anniversary of the unsuccessful 1971 Papuan declaration of independence, Biak was the scene of what is commonly known as the 'Biak Massacre' or 'Bloody Biak'. Members of the Organisasi Papua Merdeka (Free Papua Movement), raised 'The Morning Star', at Kota Biak water tower and camped there for the next six days.

At 05:30 on 6 July 1998, the demonstration was fired upon by the Tentara Nasional Indonesia (TNI or Indonesian Military). Many were shot while attempting to flee. Survivors were rounded up and forced to the docks where they were kept for several days while further demonstrators were caught.

About 200 of the original demonstrators were forcibly loaded onto two Indonesian naval vessels and taken to two different locations to be thrown into the ocean. In the following days, bodies washed up on Biak's shores, or were snarled in fishing nets. The TNI explained that the bodies turning up belonged to victims of the Aitape tsunami which occurred approximately 1,000 kilometres (621 miles) away in Papua New Guinea.

== Demographics ==
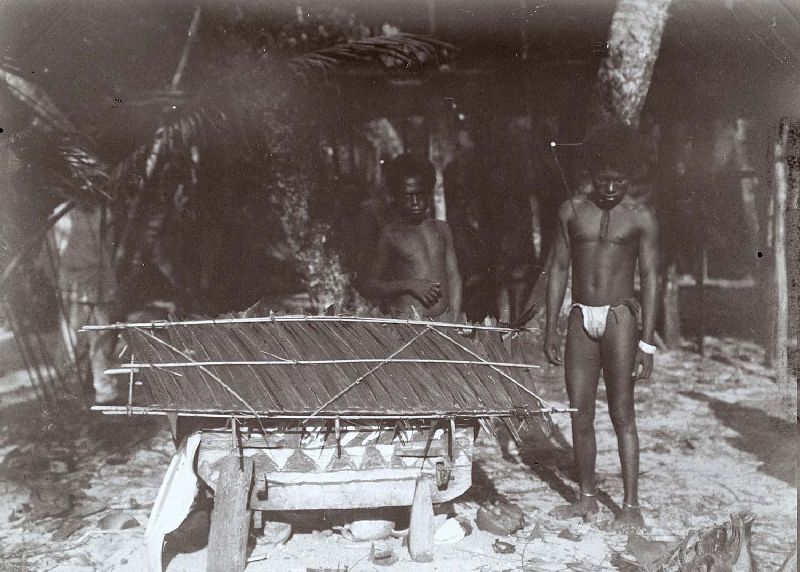
Traditional Biak burial on the coast of Wari, North Biak District (1907)

The Biak people are predominantly Melanesians, though speaking predominantly Austronesian languages and the main religion is Christianity.

In Biak and surrounding regions, many titles relating to jobs in Tidore Sultanate administration became used as clan and family names, which include Korano or Kolano (ultimately from Javanese Klono in Panji), Sanadi or Sangaji (district leader), Mayor which had job to deliver tribute to Tidore. Dimara (village leader), military leaders such as Kapitarau (sea captain) and Kapisa (captain), as well as numerous names with starting element of Rum- such as Rumbiak, Rumbewas, Rumbekwan, have origin in Tidore language, as Rum (house) referred to specific area in palace of Tidore.

However due to extensive foreign trading relationship Biak and Yapen islands as well as the Yondama bay host a sizeable descendant of foreign traders. This can be seen with these islands has the largest local Chinese-descent population in Papua provinces. They have intermarried with locals for generations and sometimes took on local family name. Proof of extensive foreign tradings also include various local traditions involving Chinese porcelains, such as Mansorandak tradition of stepping on a plate after going back from long voyage.

The official language is Indonesian and the main local language is Biak. Other languages such as English are also used, but limited. Administratively there are 12 kecamatan, covering only the island itself, having 122,166 people in the 2020 census.

== Climate ==
Climate data for Biak, Papua
Month	Jan	Feb	Mar	Apr	May	Jun	Jul	Aug	Sep	Oct	Nov	Dec	Year
Mean daily maximum °C (°F)	30.0 (86.0)	29.2 (84.6)	31.0 (87.8)	30.2 (86.4)	30.1 (86.2)	29.7 (85.5)	31.0 (87.8)	29.7 (85.5)	29.7 (85.5)	30.3 (86.5)	30.3 (86.5)	30.4 (86.7)	30.1 (86.3)
Mean daily minimum °C (°F)	23.4 (74.1)	23.7 (74.7)	23.4 (74.1)	23.2 (73.8)	23.5 (74.3)	23.2 (73.8)	23.5 (74.3)	22.9 (73.2)	22.3 (72.1)	23.6 (74.5)	23.8 (74.8)	23.7 (74.7)	23.3 (74.0)
Average precipitation mm (inches)	270 (10.6)	246 (9.7)	278 (10.9)	214 (8.4)	266 (10.5)	216 (8.5)	234 (9.2)	243 (9.6)	209 (8.2)	206 (8.1)	195 (7.7)	239 (9.4)	2,816 (110.8)
Average precipitation days	25	22	20	18	21	16	14	19	20	17	12	15	219
Source: World Meteorological Organization

Biak

Climate chart (precipitation, max. and min. temperature)
J	F	M	A	M	J	J	A	S	O	N	D
270 30 23	246 29 24	278 31 23	214 30 23	266 30 24	216 30 23	234 31 24	243 30 23	209 30 22	206 30 24	195 30 24	239 30 24
- █ Average max. and min. temperatures in °C
- █ Precipitation totals in mm
Imperial conversion
J	F	M	A	M	J	J	A	S	O	N	D
11 86 74	9.7 85 75	11 88 74	8.4 86 74	10 86 74	8.5 85 74	9.2 88 74	9.6 85 73	8.2 85 72	8.1 87 74	7.7 87 75	9.4 87 75
- █ Average max. and min. temperatures in °F
- █ Precipitation totals in inches

Biak features a tropical rainforest climate with nearly identical temperatures throughout the course of the year. The average annual temperature in the city is 26 °C (79 °F), which is also generally the average temperature of each day in Biak. The city sees a good amount of precipitation in every month throughout the course of the year, averaging roughly 2,816 millimetres (110.9 in) of precipitation per year. Its driest months November, average a little under 200 millimetres (7.9 in) of rain per month.

== Economy ==
The island is relatively rural and most Papuans on the island subsist off the land, primarily by fishing or gathering. It has large reserves of copper and nickel. For generations, most Papuans have inherited "customary claims" to parcels of land that they live off of and these property rights are defended by both the property's owner and possibly also the property owner's clan.

== Transport ==
Biak is served by Frans Kaisiepo Airport, which has flights from all over Indonesia.

Biak lies at latitude 1 degree south of the equator and consequently, any rockets launched from the island would require less fuel to reach Earth's orbit and enter into a geocentric orbit than had the same rocket been launched further away from the equator. The equatorial location offers particularly efficient launches to equatorial and near-equatorial orbits; facing eastward toward the Pacific Ocean reduces the downrange risks of launch. As of 2006, space satellite launch services had been planned for the new Biak Spaceport.

== Tradition ==
The Biak Numfor culture revolves around their ancient animist religion, although today they are Christian as well.

Their beliefs revolve around a ritual ceremony called Wor, where they will be plagued by all kinds of bad luck and sickness. The Wor is in all aspect of their life and some of their traditional ceremonies are still being held now. They include the first hair cut ceremony (Wor Kapapnik), the growing up ceremony (Wor Famarmar) and the Wedding ceremony (Wor Yakyaker Farbakbuk). All of these ceremonies are accompanied by singing, dancing and offering to ancestral spirits.

=== Yosim Pancar Dance ===
The Biak Numfor have a friendship dance called Yosim Pancar which is popular across West Papua and coastal Papua. Its small to mid-size dance group formations could last all-night long. Several "Yosim Pancar" moves that are popular till this day are: Pancar Gas, Gale-Gale, Jef, Pacul Tiga, Seka, and Poco-poco adaptation.

This dance is an amalgamation of two traditional dances namely Yosim dances originating from the bay of Sairei (Serul, Waropen) and Pancar dances originating from Biak, Numfor and Manokwari. The musical instruments used for Yosim usually used are cuku lele (Ukulele), and guitars which shows foreign influences as these were not instruments from Papua. Included was also local bass made from three strings, with the strings made from Pandan leaves. As well as Kalabasa, a dried Calabash, which was then filled with beads. In Yosim dance, the women are dressed with weavings to cover the chest, and headress made from bird feathers. While the men are bare-chested and wearing the same headress. The dance movement are more energetic though simple. In Pancar dance, the music are from Tifa drums which is the universal instruments for coastal Papuans. The drum skin is usually made from soa-soa (lizards). The movements are more stiff following the Tifa beats.

Movements include Seka, this dance movement are usually from southern coast with famous version from Kaimana, Fakfak, and Timika. In Pacul Tiga, or Pancar Meneru the dancer swing forward three steps, and throw both arms and one leg to the left and right, which was then repeated for the other leg. Jef movements are influenced by rock and roll dance from 1969-1971, Gale-Gale movements are from Wondama Bay and Mor-Mambor islands. Pancar movements are performed by the dancers move in a circle. These movements was inspired by animals, and have four variations.

The rhythm and song of Yosim Pancar dance are now being modernized with special effect sounds and pop dance beat. Originally the rhythm is to summon ancestral spirits and let them join the group. The traditional musical instrument of this dance is a self-made string bass from coconut tree and roots which is similar to the guitar or ukulele.

== Flora and fauna ==
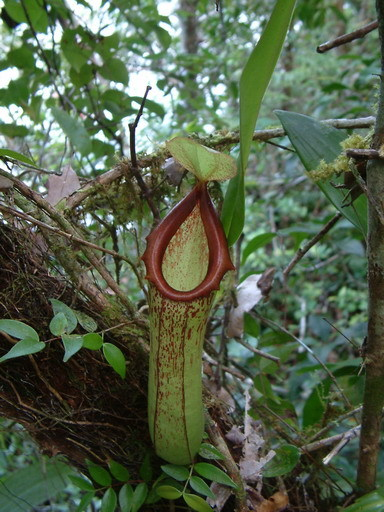
The carnivorous pitcher plant Nepenthes insignis grows on Biak.

The rain forest-covered Biak Islands have been designated the Biak–Numfoor rain forests, especially as they have the largest number of endemic bird species of any single area in the New Guinea region. There are also numerous reptile and amphibian species found here. Among the many snake species catalogued by Tom Mendelson during his herpetological survey of Biak in the 1990s, the green tree python (Morelia viridis) and the amethystine python (Morelia amethystina) were quite common. The Biak glider is a recently reclassified gliding possum species, formerly considered a sugar glider subspecies.

There are numerous types of flora in the tropical rain forest of the island, including a variety of trees and other commercially important species plus the lush vegetation of mangrove swamps. The recently discovered palm tree Manjekia maturbongsii is endemic to Biak.

== Notable people ==
- Frans Kaisiepo, 4th Governor of Papua (as West Irian) and National Hero of Indonesia
- Johannes Abraham Dimara, Indonesian Army major and National Hero of Indonesia
- Beatrix Koibur - politician.
- Raema Lisa Rumbewas - Olympic weightlifter.
- Evan Sanders - Celebrity, actor, singer
- Nitya Krishinda Maheswari - Badminton player, gold medalist at Southeast Asian Games and Asian Games.

== See also ==
- 1996 Biak earthquake
