= Ambai =

Ambai may refer to:

- Ambai Archipelago, an island group in Cenderawasih Bay, Indonesia
- Ambai people, an ethnic group from Papua province
- Ambai language, an Austronesian language spoken on the Ambai Islands
- Ambasamudram, or Ambai, a town in India
- C. S. Lakshmi (born 1944), pseudonym Ambai, Indian feminist writer
