= Ambai people =

Ethnic group in Indonesia

Ampari
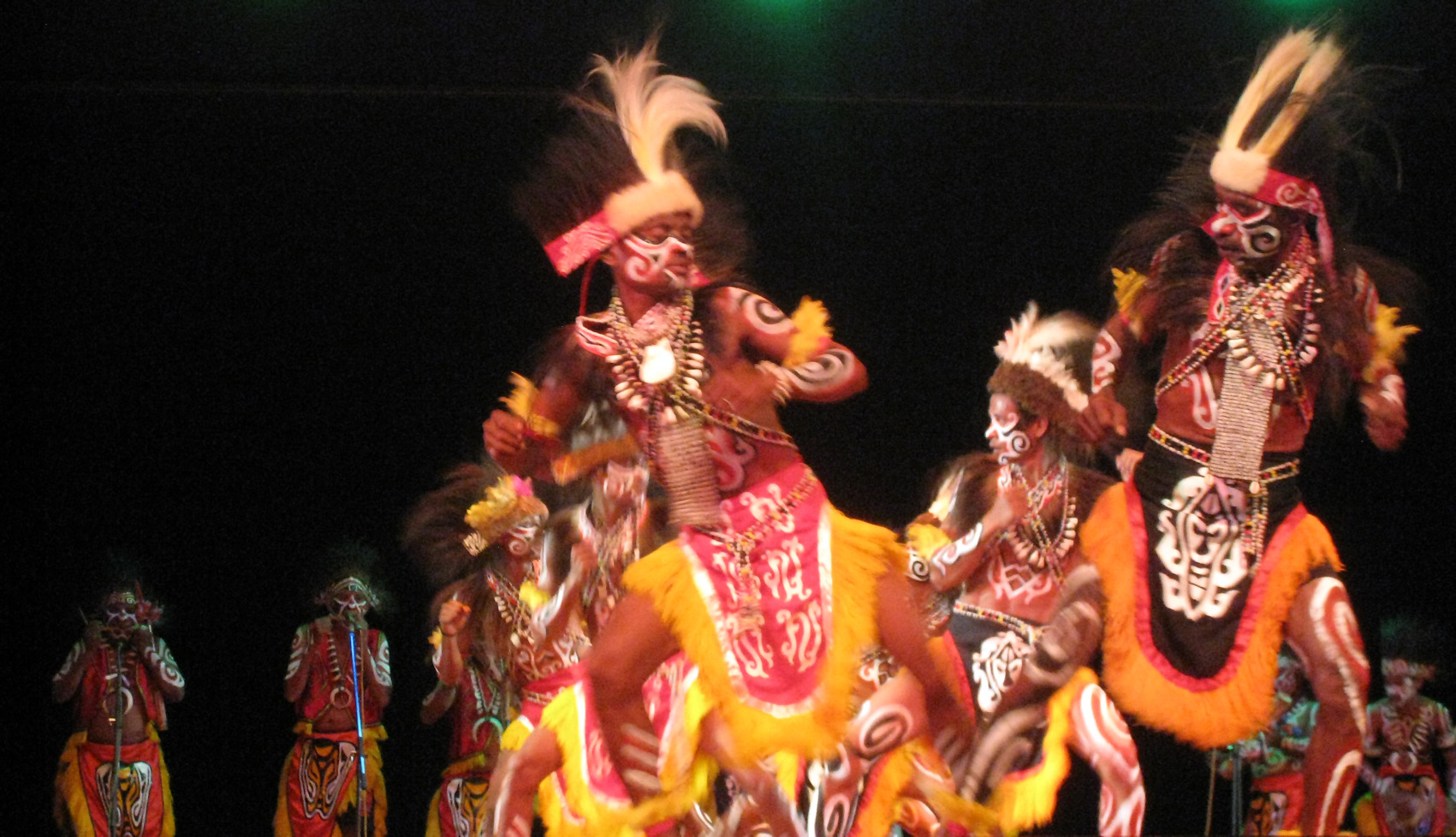
- The Afaitaneng dance (id) from Menawi village and Ambai village

Total population
- 7,500

Regions with significant populations
- Indonesia (Yapen Islands Regency)

Languages
- Ambai, Indonesian

Religion
- Protestant Christianity

Related ethnic groups
- Yapen peoples (Yawa Unat, Busami, Arui Sai, Berbai, Pombawo, Wondau–Wondei–Wonawa)

The Ambai people (Ambai: Ampari) are an ethnic subgroup of the Yapen people who inhabit the eastern coast of Yapen Island in Yapen Islands Regency, Papua Province, Indonesia. Their settlements also include the Ambai Archipelago, Nusawani, Angkaisera, Ampimoi Bay, and the western coast of East Yapen District.

The Ambai population is estimated to be around 7,500 people living in ten villages. These villages are Ambai, Rondepi, Adiwipi, Randawaipi, Menawi, Wadapi-Laut, Randaways, Wari-roni, Sumberbaba, Nunsembai, and Dawai.

The Ambai have long interacted with outside communities, evident from their early adoption of rice-field agriculture and their participation in regional trade networks, especially the exchange of Kain Timur. Ambai migrants can now also be found in areas outside the Yapen Islands such as Waropen, Jayapura, Nabire, Wasior, Biak, Sorong, and Manokwari.

== Etymology ==
The word "Ambai" comes from the Ambai language term embai, meaning "moon." Ampari is also the name of a deity in local mythology, an animal-shaped figure appearing in the folk story "Serador and Ampari".

Residents are also commonly identified by their village of origin, such as Ambai people, Menawi people, Wadapi people, Saweru people, Korombobi people, and Randawaya people.

== Language ==
The Ambai people speak the Ambai language, which has dialectal variation between villages. According to Glottolog, there are three main Ambai dialects:

- Central Ambai
- Randawaya
- Menawi
