= Kurudu =

Kurudu may refer to:

- Kurudu Island in Papua, Indonesia
- Kurudu people, the nation living on Kurudu
- Kurudu language, an Eastern Yapen language spoken by the Kurudu people
