= Kurudu people =

Ethnic group in Indonesia

Kurudu
Miobo
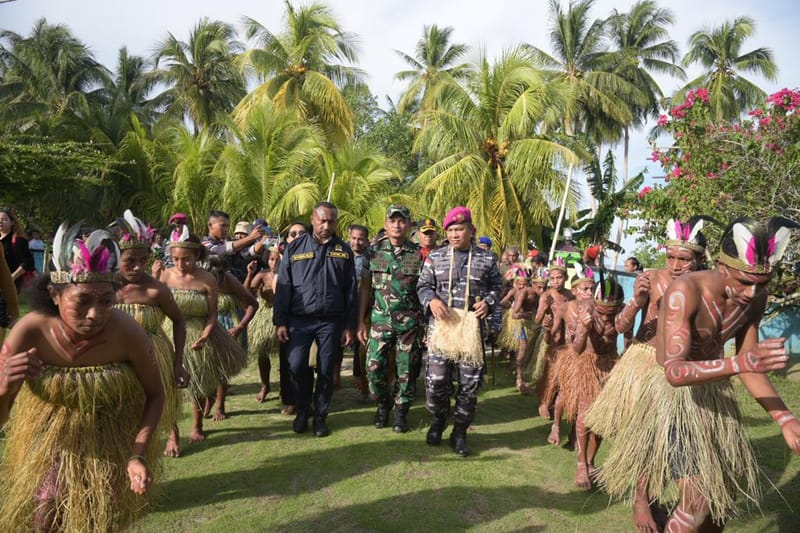
- Traditional dance of the Kurudu on Kurudu Island to welcome important guests, 2023.

Total population
- 2,180 (1988)

Regions with significant populations
- Indonesia (Kurudu Island and Pamai Erar)

Languages
- Kurudu, Papuan Malay, and Indonesian

Religion
- Christianity (majority Protestantism)

Related ethnic groups
- Ampari • Kaipuri • Serui

The Kurudu people (Kurudu: Miobo) are an ethnic group inhabiting Kurudu Island and the coast of Pamai Erar in northern Papua, Indonesia. The Kurudu people are a mixture of various ethnic groups originating from Yapen, Waropen, and Biak, who assimilated with the original inhabitants of Kurudu in the past and formed today's Kurudu population. Today, the Kurudu and the Kaipuri have been united and are known collectively as the Miobo people.

19th century Dutch writer Dr. J.J. de Hollander wrote that, "[t]he inhabitants of Kurudu consist of entirely wild tribes, dangerous yet polite people".

== History ==
Kurudu Island, called Miobo Krudu by the Kurudu, is part of the Yapen Islands region in the province of Papua, Indonesia. This island has been known to be a supplier of trade goods, both among Papuan traders and with traders from outside the region. This is evident from European records written during the Dutch East India Company era and the period of colonial administration in Western New Guinea.

Kurudu Island was recorded by the Spanish as La Ballena ("The Whale") in 1545, but remained largely forgotten. In the 18th century, it appeared more frequently in European writings, which described its trade activities. Sir Thomas Forrest visited in February 1775, calling it the "Island of Krudo", and noting that the Kurudu–Kaipuri people often collected turtle shells to trade with Chinese merchants. The regions of Yapen, Waropen, and Nabire were among the places where Chinese, Bugis, Makassar, Seram, and European traders bartered with the local population.

The Kurudu people produced clay pottery (sempe), carvings, boats, and sago, traded widely along the northern Papuan coast. Their trade network extended to the Mamberamo River and into the Tabi region (Jayapura City and Jayapura Regency), for example, bringing beads, knives, plates, and exchanging them with the Mamberamo people.

In a report by Resident Braam Morris during a visit to Pauwi village in Mamberamo on 21 July 1884, he found that the locals possessed beads, knives, plates, and other goods obtained from Kurudu, indicating that Kurudu traders regularly traveled there. A local Mamberamo korano (chief) named Anggori could also speak the Kurudu language. The Mamberamo people likely received foreign goods through Kurudu intermediaries rather than directly from Chinese traders, supporting Thomas Forrest's notes that Chinese traders once had contact with the Kurudu people.

Christian missionary work on Kurudu Island began in 1929 with the voyage of Laurens Tanamal, documented by the priest Albert Jan de Neef and detailed in the 2022 Indonesian novel Di Tapal Batas: Mambu Ransar (On the Border: Mambu Ransar) by Alex Runggeary.

== Population ==
The Kurudu people are indigenous to the Yapen Islands Regency and the northern coast of Mamberamo Raya Regency. They mainly inhabit the East Yapen district (now divided into several districts, including Kurudu Island) and Waropen Atas district (including Sawai). In 1988, East Yapen had 7,397 residents, and Waropen Atas 4,580, including 2,180 Kurudu people.

== Culture ==
=== Traditional medicine ===
During the global COVID-19 pandemic, the Kurudu people believed in the efficacy of three plants thought to ward off the virus. The three plants in the war wen medicine tradition were: nianggotr (forest betel), nianggoi tu (domestic betel), and manemyo (sea betel).

=== Traditional boats ===
Because the Kurudu inhabit coastal areas, they have developed a strong maritime tradition with several boat types:

1. Wantbo (fishing boat)
2. Dakam (inter-island transport and trade)
3. Mansusu (war and slave-raiding boat)

Each type is equipped with paddles (awo), sails (sariun), naju (adaisi), outriggers (arui), mata naju (adaisi re), and bailers (asobo).

With modernization came four motorized boats:

1. Wa yonson (trade, fishing, transport)
2. Kole-kole
3. Speedboat
4. Jolor

Kurudu boatbuilders have specialized knowledge of wantbo bow and stern construction. The bow and stern in Kurudu are referred to as ode — the front is ode waraun, and the back ode wasriu. Kurudu boat designs are distinct from other groups.

== Notable people ==
- Yan Permenas Mandenas, Indonesian politician
