= 1979 Petatlán earthquake =

Earthquake in Mexico

- Location within Mexico
- UTC time: 1979-03-14 11:07:16
- ISC event: 668141
- USGS-ANSS: ComCat
- Local date: 14 March 1979
- Local time: 05:07:16
- Duration: 2 minutes and 10 seconds
- Magnitude: 7.6 M_{s} 7.4 M_{w}
- Depth: 18.5 km (11 mi)
- Epicenter: 17.73°N 101.28°W
- Areas affected: Mexico
- Total damage: US$30 million
- Max. intensity: MMI VIII (Severe)
- Tsunami: 1.3 m
- Casualties: 5 dead, 35 injured

The 1979 Petatlán earthquake, also known as the IBERO earthquake occurred on March 14 at 05:07 local time in the Mexican state of Guerrero. The earthquake had a surface-wave magnitude of M_{s} 7.6 or moment magnitude of M_{w} 7.4 and maximum Modified Mercalli intensity of VIII (Severe). The epicenter, onshore, was located 12 km south southeast of Vallecitos de Zaragoza.

With a shallow hypocenter depth of 18.5 km, the earthquake caused extensive and widespread damage in Guerrero, including the near total destruction of campus buildings at Universidad Iberoamericana in Mexico City. Five people died and 35 others were injured due to the earthquake. The earthquake was felt in the states of Jalisco, Guerrero and Puebla, where damage was reported.

== Tectonic setting ==
Mexico is one of the most seismically active regions in the world; located at the boundary of at least three tectonic plates. The west coast of Mexico lies at a convergent plate boundary between the Cocos plate and North American plate. The Cocos plate consisting of denser oceanic lithosphere, subducts beneath the less dense continental crust of the North American plate. Most of the Mexican landmass is situated on the North American plate moving westward. Because the oceanic crust is relatively dense, when the bottom of the Pacific Ocean meets the lighter continental crust of the Mexican landmass, the ocean floor subducts beneath the North American plate creating the Middle America Trench along the southern coast of Mexico. Occasionally, the contact interface or subduction zone megathrust release elastic strain during earthquakes. Large and sudden uplift of the seafloor can produce large tsunamis when such earthquakes occur.

== Earthquake ==
The earthquake occurred as a result of thrust faulting due to a rupture on the subduction zone near the west coast of Mexico. The M_{s} 7.6 earthquake was the largest subduction zone thrust event in the region since 1943. The quake partially ruptured the Guerrero gap; a seismic gap on the subduction one that is capable of an earthquake of magnitude 8.0 or greater. Modelling of the finite fault suggest a rupture patch measuring 120 km by 120 km on the megathrust, involving two asperities. Slip on the megathrust occurred at depths ranging between 3–25 km. Inversion of P-wave data revealed a limited area where the slip was 0.7 meters, while the peak slip was 1.19 meters. The rupture zone of the 1979 earthquake is located immediately southeast of that of the 1985 Mexico City earthquake. Another magnitude 7.6 quake, the aftershock of the 1985 quake, ruptured the shallow section of the megathrust, up-dip of the 1979 quake.

=== Tsunami ===
A weak tsunami with a maximum height of 1.3 meters was generated. The tsunami was also recorded on ocean bottom tide gauges in the Pacific Ocean near the epicenter of the quake.

== Impact ==
Substantial damage was reported in Mexico City. The earthquake severely damaged and collapsed two buildings in the Ibero-American University compound. Nine structures suffered serious damage and 25 had significant damage. Despite the collapse, there were no casualties as it did not occur during school hours. In total, 90% of structures in the university was affected by the tremor. At the time of the quake, an estimated 7,200 students were enrolled in the university. Scheduled lessons resumed on 22 March 1979 at the National Polytechnic Institute College of Engineering and Physical-Mathematic Sciences, which was undamaged. Water supply was disrupted by the earthquake, which left many residents without access to water for 48 hours. A total of 600 structures, including homes, cinemas, and other public infrastructures were damaged in the city.

The earthquake had a maximum Mercalli intensity of VIII (Severe) recorded in Chilpancingo. The city suffered significant damage in the downtown area. A seven-story reinforced concrete building was demolished due to the severe damage it sustained during the quake. In Petatlán, Guerrero, the earthquake destroyed some adobe styled homes.

== See also ==
- List of earthquakes in 1979
- List of earthquakes in Mexico
