= 1979 Yapen earthquake =

Earthquake in Papua Province, Indonesia

- Location within Papua (province) Location within Indonesia
- UTC time: 1979-09-12 05:17:51
- ISC event: 658645
- USGS-ANSS: ComCat
- Local date: September 12, 1979
- Local time: 14:17:51 WIT (Indonesia Eastern Standard Time)
- Magnitude: 7.5 M_{w} 7.9 M_{s}
- Depth: 20 km (12 mi)
- Epicenter: 1.679°S 136.94°E
- Type: Strike-slip
- Max. intensity: MMI VIII (Severe)
- Tsunami: 2 m (6 ft 7 in)
- Casualties: 115 killed

The 1979 Yapen earthquake occurred on September 12 at 05:17:51 UTC. It had an epicenter near the coast of Yapen Island in Irian Jaya, Indonesia. Measuring 7.5 on the moment magnitude scale and having a depth of 20 km (12 mi), it caused severe damage on the island. At least 115 were killed due to shaking and a moderate tsunami.

== Tectonic setting ==
The northern coast of New Guinea is situated in a region of east–west oblique plate convergence between the Australian and Pacific plates. The oceanic crust of the Pacific plate subducts obliquely beneath New Guinea and nearby islands along the New Britain Trench and Manokwari Trough. A large component of this oblique convergence is accommodated by east–west left-lateral shear at a rate of 80 mm/yr. The shear zone is approximately 300 km (190 mi) long and is a complex zone of faults. The Sorong, Koor, Ransiki and Yapen faults are the largest structures forming the shear zone.

== Earthquake ==
The earthquake occurred due to left-lateral strike-slip faulting on the 420 km (260 mi) long Yapen Fault. The Yapen Fault is the fastest-slipping fault in the shear zone, estimated to move at a rate of 46 ± 12 mm/yr. It crosses east–west through Cenderawasih Bay. Seismologist Emile A. Okal estimated that the rupture produced up to 2 m (6 ft 7 in) of displacement on an east-southeast–west-northwest fault. The total rupture length was 75 km (47 mi) × 35 km (22 mi). A study in 2002 estimated the rupture to be 80 km (50 mi) × 15 km (9.3 mi) and producing up to 7 m (23 ft) of slip. It was followed by an aftershock sequence trending east–west. A cluster of aftershocks occurred north of the mainshock, at Pandaidori, displayed reverse faulting. This aftershock sequence is thought to be triggered by stress transfer.

== Damage ==
Shaking from the mainshock killed 15 people and demolished at least 1,000 homes. Despite being a strike-slip earthquake, slip of up to 2 m (6 ft 7 in) was sufficient to generate a moderate tsunami near the coastline. Waves measuring 2 m (6 ft 7 in) was recorded at Biak. The tsunami killed at least 100 people on Yapen Island. A fisherman on Biak was among the fatalities after being swept away by the waves. In West Yapen District, 76 homes were destroyed and flooded by the tsunami. Many residents had to hold themselves onto stable objects during the shaking. Ground cracks occurred. Many churches and homes collapsed. In two villages, all homes were destroyed. A large fissure up to 1.5 km (0.93 mi) was reported in Serui. In Menawi, 254 homes were seriously damaged. A further 90 homes and a school were destroyed at Randawaya II.

After the earthquake, local government officials in Jayapura were not notified about the earthquake due to a local event. It was only after news was transmitted to Garuda Indonesia in Sentani were they informed. The Indonesian Minister of Home Affairs appointed the Governor of Irian Jaya to respond immediately to the affected area. A total of 16,500 residents were displaced.

== See also ==
- List of earthquakes in 1979
- List of earthquakes in Indonesia
