= Teluk Cenderawasih National Park =

National park in Indonesia

- Taman Nasional Teluk Cenderawasih
- IUCN category II (national park)
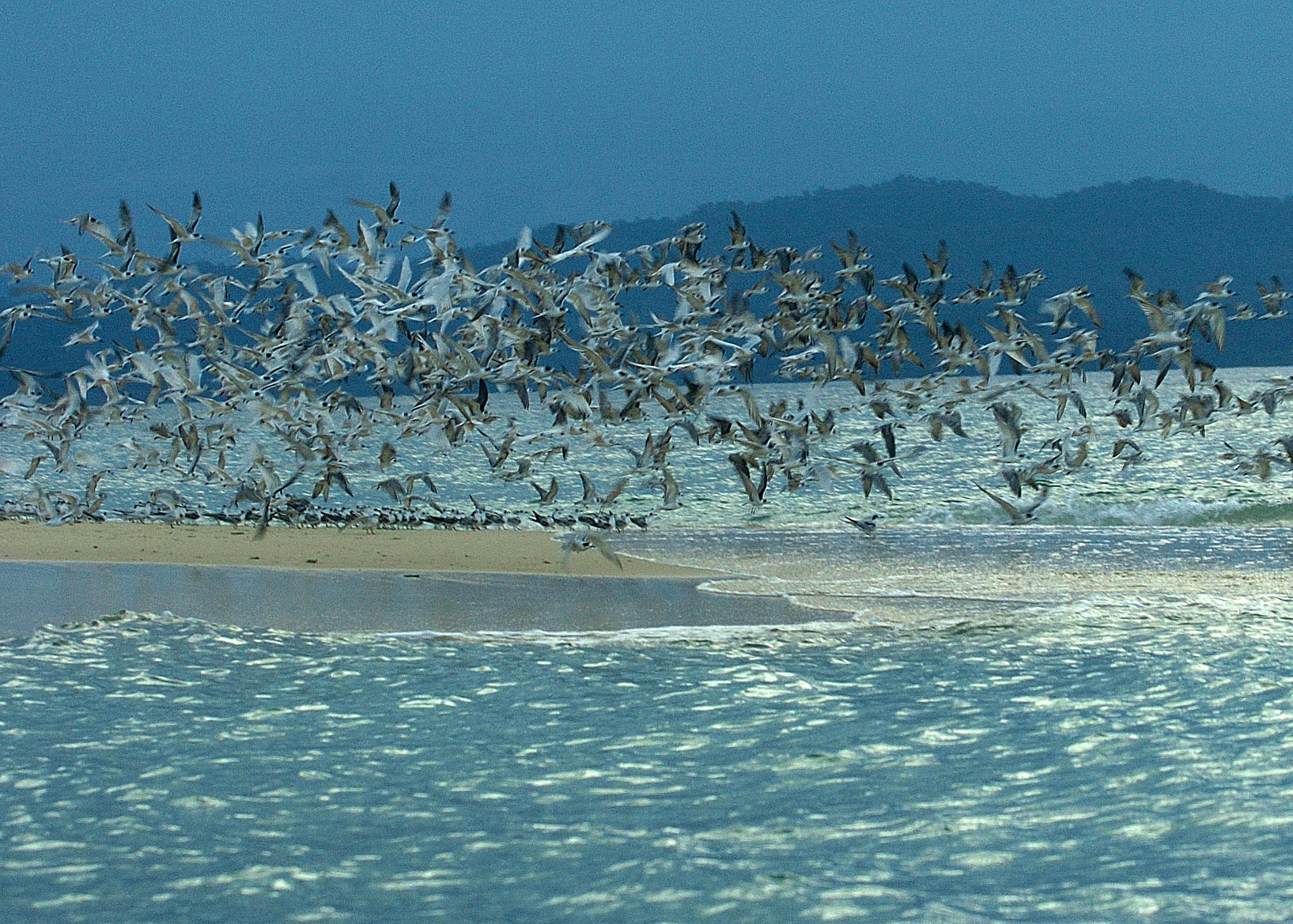
- Birds in Auri Island, Cendrawasih Bay NP

- Location within Western New Guinea
- Location: West Papua, Indonesia
- Nearest city: Manokwari
- Coordinates: 2°30′S 134°38′E
- Area: 14,535 km^{2} (5,612 sq mi)
- Established: 2002
- Governing body: Ministry of Forestry

Teluk Cenderawasih National Park is the largest marine national park of Indonesia, located in Cenderawasih Bay, south-east of Bird's Head Peninsula. It includes the islands of Mioswaar, Nusrowi Island, Roon, Rumberpon, Anggrameos and Yoop. The park protects a rich marine ecosystem, with over 150 recorded coral species, for which it is considered a potential World Heritage Site.

== Flora and fauna ==
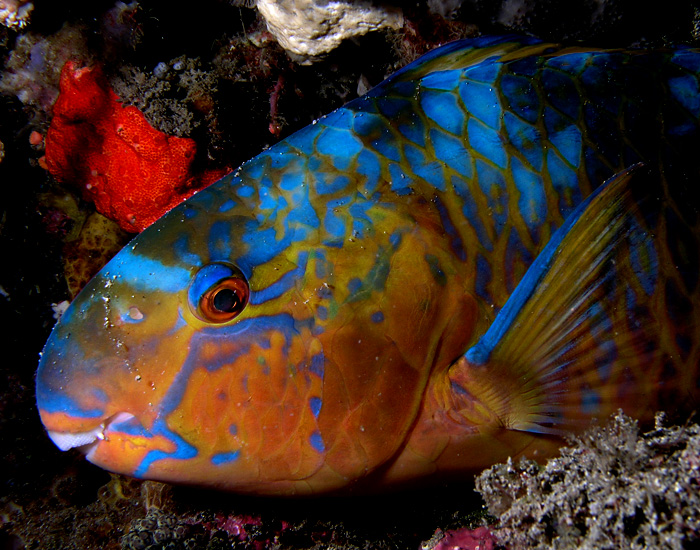
Parrotfish, one of over 200 fish species recorded in the national park

Extending over 14,535 km^{2}, the national park includes coastal and mangrove ecosystems (0.9%), coral reefs (5.5%), island tropical forest ecosystems (3.8%), and marine waters (89.8%). Some 46 species of plant have been recorded on the islands, dominated by Bruguiera and Avicennia species, Nypa fruticans, Metroxylon sagu, Casuarina equisetifolia, and Terminalia catappa.

The coral reef ecosystem forms part of the Coral Triangle region. In the park, 150 species of coral have been recorded, consisting of 15 families and distributed on the shores of 18 islands. Among these are colonies of blue coral, black coral, Leptoseris species, Mycedium elephantotus, and Octocorallia or soft corals. The percentage of live coral coverage varies from between 30 and 40% to 64-65%.

Over 200 fish species inhabit the park, among them butterflyfish, damselfish, parrotfish, rabbitfish, clownfish and sharks including whale sharks. Species of mollusc include cowry, Strombidae, Lambis species, Charonia tritonis, and giant clam.

Four species of turtle are common in the park: the hawksbill turtle, green turtle, olive ridley turtle, and leatherback turtle. Mammals include dugong, blue whale and dolphins.

== Human habitation ==
About 14,000 people live in 72 villages within the park. Several Austronesian languages are spoken in the area, which form part of the Cenderawasih languages branch and include: Wandamen, Dusner, Meoswar, Roon and Yeretuar. Most of the park is part of Teluk Wondama Regency of West Papua province, while the eastern part is in Nabire Regency of Central Papua province.

== Conservation ==
In 1990, the area was designated as Teluk Cendrawasih Marine Nature Reserve. The national park was designated in 1993 and declared in 2002. The park is managed by Balai Taman Nasional with a personnel of 106.
