= List of earthquakes in 1979 =

Earthquakes in 1979
Approximate epicenters of the earthquakes in 1979
- 4.0–5.9 magnitude
- 6.0–6.9 magnitude
- 7.0–7.9 magnitude
- 8.0+ magnitude
- Strongest: 7.9 M_{w} Indonesia
- Deadliest: 7.7 M_{w} Ecuador; 600 deaths
- Total fatalities: 1,649

Number by magnitude
- 9.0+: 0
- 8.0–8.9: 0
- 7.0–7.9: 8
- 6.0–6.9: 86
- 5.0–5.9: 1,374
- 4.0–4.9: 2,973

This is a list of earthquakes in 1979. Only earthquakes of magnitude 6 or above are included, unless they result in damage and/or casualties, or are notable for some other reason. Events in remote areas will not be listed but included in statistics and maps. Countries are entered on the lists in order of their status in this particular year. All dates are listed according to UTC time. Maximum intensities are indicated on the Mercalli intensity scale and are sourced from United States Geological Survey (USGS) ShakeMap data. A fairly quiet year once again although there was a number of events which caused significant fatalities. The largest of only 8 magnitude 7.0+ events reached 7.9 and struck Indonesia in September. Ecuador was affected by a magnitude 7.7 in December which left 600 people dead. Other areas suffering from deadly events included Iran, Colombia, Indonesia and present day Montenegro.

== By death toll ==
Rank	Death toll	Magnitude	Location	MMI	Depth (km)	Date
1	600	7.7	Ecuador, off the coast of Esmeraldas Province	IX (Violent)	24.0	December 12
2	350	6.6	Iran, South Khorasan Province	VIII (Severe)	33.0	November 14
3	200	6.7	Iran, South Khorasan Province	VIII (Severe)	33.0	January 16
4	131	6.9	Yugoslavia, Bar Municipality, Montenegro	X (Extreme)	10.0	April 15
5	115	7.9	Indonesia, Yapen	VIII (Severe)	5.0	September 12
6	72	6.4	Colombia, Valle del Cauca Department	IX (Violent)	108.0	November 23
7	42	5.5	China, Jiangsu Province	VIII (Severe)	11.0	July 9
8	30	6.1	Indonesia, West Java	VI (Strong)	62.0	November 2
9	27	6.3	Indonesia, Bali	VI (Strong)	33.0	December 17
10	22	6.1	Indonesia, Bali	V (Moderate)	25.0	May 30
11	18	6.9	Peru, Arequipa Region	VII (Very strong)	53.0	February 16
12	17	7.1	Iran, South Khorasan Province	VIII (Severe)	10.0	November 27

Listed are earthquakes with at least 10 dead.

== By magnitude ==
Rank	Magnitude	Death toll	Location	MMI	Depth (km)	Date
1	7.9	115	Indonesia, Yapen	VIII (Severe)	5.0	September 12
2	7.7	600	Ecuador, off the coast of Esmeraldas Province	IX (Violent)	24.0	December 12
3	7.6	5	Mexico, Guerrero	VIII (Severe)	49.0	March 14
4	7.4	0	New Zealand, off the south coast of South Island	V (Moderate)	33.0	October 12
= 5	7.1	0	United States, southeast Alaska	IX (Violent)	15.0	February 28
= 5	7.1	0	Philippines, Babuyan Islands	VI (Strong)	15.0	August 26
= 5	7.1	0	Solomon Islands, Makira	VII (Very strong)	22.0	October 23
= 5	7.1	17	Iran, South Khorasan Province	VIII (Severe)	10.0	November 27

Listed are earthquakes with at least 7.0 magnitude.

== By month ==
=== January ===
January
- Strongest: 6.7 M_{w} Iran
- Deadliest: 6.7 M_{w} Iran; 200 deaths
- Total fatalities: 200

Number by magnitude
- 8.0–8.9: 0
- 7.0–7.9: 0
- 6.0–6.9: 8
- 5.0–5.9: 105
- 4.0–4.9: 214

Date	Country and location	M_{w}	Depth (km)	MMI	Notes	Casualties	
Date	Country and location	M_{w}	Depth (km)	MMI	Notes	Dead	Injured
16	Iran, South Khorasan Province	6.7	33.0	VIII	200 people were killed and at least 101 were injured. Some damage was caused.	200	101
17	Soviet Union, Atyrau Region, Kazakhstan	6.0	0.0		Nuclear test.		
26	Mexico, Guerrero	6.6	41.0	VI			
27	New Hebrides, Vanuatu	6.3	25.0				
27	United States, Alaska Peninsula	6.0	17.0	V			

=== February ===
February
- Strongest: 7.1 M_{w} United States
- Deadliest: 6.9 M_{w} Peru; 18 deaths
- Total fatalities: 18

Number by magnitude
- 8.0–8.9: 0
- 7.0–7.9: 1
- 6.0–6.9: 7
- 5.0–5.9: 111
- 4.0–4.9: 192

Date	Country and location	M_{w}	Depth (km)	MMI	Notes	Casualties	
Date	Country and location	M_{w}	Depth (km)	MMI	Notes	Dead	Injured
11	Philippines, off the southeast coast of Mindanao	6.1	142.0	IV			
13	United States, Alaska Peninsula	6.7	33.0	IV			
16	New Hebrides, Vanuatu	6.2	60.0	V			
16	Peru, Arequipa Region	6.9	53.0	VII	18 people were killed and at least 51 were injured. Some damage was caused.	18	51
20	Japan, off the east coast of Honshu	6.4	10.0				
28	United States, southeast Alaska	7.1	15.0	IX	Some damage was reported due to the 1979 Saint Elias earthquake.		

=== March ===
March
- Strongest: 7.6 M_{w} Mexico
- Deadliest: 7.6 M_{w} Mexico; 5 deaths
- Total fatalities: 5

Number by magnitude
- 8.0–8.9: 0
- 7.0–7.9: 1
- 6.0–6.9: 7
- 5.0–5.9: 121
- 4.0–4.9: 304

Date	Country and location	M_{w}	Depth (km)	MMI	Notes	Casualties	
Date	Country and location	M_{w}	Depth (km)	MMI	Notes	Dead	Injured
8	Indonesia, off the north coast of Minahasa Peninsula	6.0	28.0	VI			
9	Papua New Guinea, Central Province (Papua New Guinea)	6.1	33.0	V			
14	Mexico, Guerrero	7.6	49.0	VIII	The 1979 Petatlán earthquake killed 5 people and injured 35 . 200 homes were destroyed with property damage costs $30 million (1979 rate).	5	35
15	China, Yunnan Province	6.2	33.0	VII			
23	Dominican Republic, off the south coast	6.1	80.0	VI			

=== April ===
April
- Strongest: 6.9 M_{w} Yugoslavia, Montenegro
- Deadliest: 6.9 M_{w} Yugoslavia, Montenegro; 131 deaths
- Total fatalities: 131

Number by magnitude
- 8.0–8.9: 0
- 7.0–7.9: 0
- 6.0–6.9: 6
- 5.0–5.9: 109
- 4.0–4.9: 291

Date	Country and location	M_{w}	Depth (km)	MMI	Notes	Casualties	
Date	Country and location	M_{w}	Depth (km)	MMI	Notes	Dead	Injured
9	Yugoslavia, off the coast of Ulcinj Municipality, Montenegro	5.3	10.0	V	Foreshock to April 15 event. Some damage was caused.		
10	Indonesia, Molucca Sea	6.8	37.0	V			
15	Yugoslavia, Bar Municipality, Montenegro	6.9	10.0	X	The 1979 Montenegro earthquake was one of the worst in the Balkan Peninsula. 131 people died and at least 1,001 were injured. Substantial property damage was caused with costs of $2.7 billion (1979 rate).	131	1,001
28	Chile, Atacama Region	6.1	23.0	VI			

=== May ===
May
- Strongest: 6.4 M_{w} 2 events reached this magnitude.
- Deadliest: 6.1 M_{w} Indonesia; 22 deaths
- Total fatalities: 22

Number by magnitude
- 8.0–8.9: 0
- 7.0–7.9: 0
- 6.0–6.9: 9
- 5.0–5.9: 132
- 4.0–4.9: 270

Date	Country and location	M_{w}	Depth (km)	MMI	Notes	Casualties	
Date	Country and location	M_{w}	Depth (km)	MMI	Notes	Dead	Injured
1	Philippines, Mindanao	6.0	23.0	VI			
1	France, southeast of the Loyalty Islands, New Caledonia	6.4	79.0	VII			
20	United States, Alaska Peninsula	6.4	71.0	VI	Minor damage was caused.		
21	Indonesia, Bali	5.7	76.0	V	Foreshock to May 30 event. Some damage was caused.		
21	Peru, Puno Region	6.0	208.0				
24	Yugoslavia, Kotor Municipality, Montenegro	6.2	8.0	VIII	Aftershock of April 15 event. 65 people were hurt and some damage was caused.		65
30	Indonesia, Bali	6.1	25.0	V	22 deaths were caused along with $4.15 million (1979 rate) in damage.	22	

=== June ===
June
- Strongest: 6.3 M_{w} 2 events reached this magnitude.
- Total fatalities: 0

Number by magnitude
- 8.0–8.9: 0
- 7.0–7.9: 0
- 6.0–6.9: 7
- 5.0–5.9: 108
- 4.0–4.9: 233

Date	Country and location	M_{w}	Depth (km)	MMI	Notes	Casualties	
Date	Country and location	M_{w}	Depth (km)	MMI	Notes	Dead	Injured
2	Australia, Western Australia	6.1	6.0	VIII	Damage with costs of $1.5 million (1979 rate) was caused.		
22	Mexico, Oaxaca	6.3	107.0	VI			
23	Soviet Union, East Kazakhstan Region, Kazakhstan	6.3	0.0		Nuclear test.		
25	Papua New Guinea, Madang Province	6.2	189.0	IV	Some damage was caused.		

=== July ===
July
- Strongest: 6.9 M_{w} Indonesia
- Deadliest: 5.5 M_{w} China, 42 deaths
- Total fatalities: 42

Number by magnitude
- 8.0–8.9: 0
- 7.0–7.9: 0
- 6.0–6.9: 5
- 5.0–5.9: 111
- 4.0–4.9: 255

Date	Country and location	M_{w}	Depth (km)	MMI	Notes	Casualties	
Date	Country and location	M_{w}	Depth (km)	MMI	Notes	Dead	Injured
1	Panama, Chiriqui Province	6.5	28.0	VII	$2 million (1979 rate) in damage were reported.		
4	Soviet Union, Kuril Islands, Russia	6.0	78.0	V			
9	China, Jiangsu Province	5.5	11.0	VIII	Despite being a moderate magnitude there was extensive damage caused by this event. 42 people were killed and 2,987 were injured. 113,909 rooms (homes) were destroyed and 272,884 were damaged. 11 bridges were damaged.	42	2,987
18	Turkey, Balikesir Province	5.2	10.0	VI	200 homes were destroyed.		
24	Indonesia, south of Java	6.9	31.0				

=== August ===
August
- Strongest: 7.1 M_{w} Philippines
- Total fatalities: 0

Number by magnitude
- 8.0–8.9: 0
- 7.0–7.9: 1
- 6.0–6.9: 9
- 5.0–5.9: 94
- 4.0–4.9: 284

Date	Country and location	M_{w}	Depth (km)	MMI	Notes	Casualties	
Date	Country and location	M_{w}	Depth (km)	MMI	Notes	Dead	Injured
4	Soviet Union, East Kazakhstan Region, Kazakhstan	6.1	0.0		Nuclear test.		
6	United States, northern California	5.8	8.3	VIII	16 injuries were caused by the 1979 Coyote Lake earthquake. Some damage was caused in the area. Costs were $500,000 (1979 rate).		16
16	North Korea, off the northeast coast	6.1	588.0				
17	New Hebrides, Vanuatu	6.1	17.0	V			
18	Soviet Union, East Kazakhstan Region, Kazakhstan	6.1	0.0		Nuclear test.		
20	Afghanistan, Badakhshan Province	6.1	229.0	IV			
24	Costa Rica, Puntarenas Province	6.4	40.0	VI			
24	China, western Inner Mongolia	5.9	33.0	VI	104 people were injured and 400 homes were destroyed.		104
26	New Hebrides, Vanuatu	6.0	10.0	IV			
26	Philippines, Babuyan Islands	7.1	15.0	VI			

=== September ===
September
- Strongest: 7.9 M_{w} Indonesia
- Deadliest: 7.9 M_{w} Indonesia; 115 deaths
- Total fatalities: 120

Number by magnitude
- 8.0–8.9: 0
- 7.0–7.9: 1
- 6.0–6.9: 2
- 5.0–5.9: 105
- 4.0–4.9: 233

Date	Country and location	M_{w}	Depth (km)	MMI	Notes	Casualties	
Date	Country and location	M_{w}	Depth (km)	MMI	Notes	Dead	Injured
12	Indonesia, Yapen	7.9	5.0	VIII	During the 1979 Yapen earthquake, 115 people were killed and at least 101 were injured. Most of the deaths were from a tsunami which swept across nearby islands. 1,000 homes were destroyed.	115	101
19	Italy, Umbria	5.9	16.0	IX	5 people were killed and at least 5,000 were injured. Major damage was caused.	5	5,000
29	Indonesia, off the west coast of northern Sumatra	6.8	27.0				

=== October ===
October
- Strongest: 7.4 M_{w} New Zealand
- Deadliest: 6.8 M_{w} Guatemala; 4 deaths
- Total fatalities: 6

Number by magnitude
- 8.0–8.9: 0
- 7.0–7.9: 2
- 6.0–6.9: 9
- 5.0–5.9: 141
- 4.0–4.9: 242

Date	Country and location	M_{w}	Depth (km)	MMI	Notes	Casualties	
Date	Country and location	M_{w}	Depth (km)	MMI	Notes	Dead	Injured
9	Guatemala, Jutiapa Department	5.0	33.0	VII	40 people were hurt and some damage was caused.		40
12	New Zealand, off the south coast of South Island	7.4	33.0	V			
15	Mexico, Baja California	6.4	15.0	X	The 1979 Imperial Valley earthquake caused major damage in the area. 91 people were injured. Extensive damage was caused to buildings and infrastructure. Costs were $30 million (1979 rate).		91
17	Indonesia, Biak	6.0	33.0	VI	Aftershock of September 12 event.		
20	Indonesia, Bali	6.2	38.0	VI	2 people were killed and 40 were hurt. Some damage was caused.	2	40
23	Solomon Islands, Makira	7.1	22.0	VII			
27	Guatemala, offshore Escuintla Department	6.8	58.0	VII	4 deaths were caused as well as 20 injuries in El Salvador. 3 people were hurt in Guatemala. Some damage was caused. Doublet earthquake.	4	23
27	Guatemala, offshore Escuintla Department	6.6	65.0	VI	4 deaths were caused as well as 20 injuries in El Salvador. 3 people were hurt in Guatemala. Some damage was caused. Doublet earthquake.		
28	Soviet Union, East Kazakhstan Region, Kazakhstan	6.0	0.0		Nuclear test.		

=== November ===
November
- Strongest: 7.1 M_{w} Iran
- Deadliest: 6.6 M_{w} Iran; 350 deaths
- Total fatalities: 470

Number by magnitude
- 8.0–8.9: 0
- 7.0–7.9: 1
- 6.0–6.9: 11
- 5.0–5.9: 99
- 4.0–4.9: 231

Date	Country and location	M_{w}	Depth (km)	MMI	Notes	Casualties	
Date	Country and location	M_{w}	Depth (km)	MMI	Notes	Dead	Injured
2	New Hebrides, Vanuatu	6.1	33.0	VI			
2	Indonesia, West Java	6.1	62.0	VI	30 people were killed and 200 were injured. Damage costs of $16 million (1979 rate) were reported.	30	200
6	Greece, Epirus (region)	5.4	40.0	VIII	1 person died and 3 were injured. Major damage was caused.	1	3
6	Solomon Islands	6.1	30.0	V			
9	New Hebrides, Vanuatu	6.1	45.0	VI			
13	Indonesia, off the south coast of Sumatra	6.3	47.0	IV			
13	Tonga	6.6	32.0				
14	Iran, South Khorasan Province	6.6	33.0	VIII	Foreshock to the 1979 Ghaenat earthquakes mainshock on November 27. 350 deaths were caused along with major damage.	350	
16	Fiji	6.9	33.0	VIII	Some damage was reported.		
19	Philippines, Mindanao	6.1	85.0	V			
23	Colombia, Valle del Cauca Department	6.4	108.0	IX	72 people were killed and 600 were injured. $20 million (1979 rate) in damage was reported.	72	600
27	Iran, South Khorasan Province	7.1	10.0	VIII	In the 1979 Ghaenat earthquakes, 17 people died and 24 were injured. Major damage was caused.	17	24

=== December ===
December
- Strongest: 8.2 M_{w} Ecuador
- Deadliest: 8.2 M_{w} Ecuador; 600 deaths
- Total fatalities: 635

Number by magnitude
- 8.0–8.9: 1
- 7.0–7.9: 0
- 6.0–6.9: 6
- 5.0–5.9: 138
- 4.0–4.9: 224

Date	Country and location	M_{w}	Depth (km)	MMI	Notes	Casualties	
Date	Country and location	M_{w}	Depth (km)	MMI	Notes	Dead	Injured
2	Soviet Union, East Kazakhstan Region, Kazakhstan	6.0	0.0		Nuclear test.		
7	Iran, South Khorasan Province	6.0	31.0	VIII	Aftershock of November 27 event. Further damage was reported.		
12	Ecuador, off the coast of Esmeraldas Province	8.2	24.0	IX	Deadliest event of 1979. 600 people were killed in the 1979 Tumaco earthquake and a tsunami which was generated. 20,000 people were injured. 10,000 homes were destroyed and costs reached $8 million (1979 rate).	600	20,000
15	Indonesia, southern Sumatra	6.6	33.0	VII	8 people were killed and 162 were hurt. 2,500 homes were destroyed.	8	162
17	Indonesia, off the east coast of Bali	6.3	33.0	VI	The 1979 Bali earthquake left 27 people dead and 200 were injured. Some damage was caused.	27	200
23	Soviet Union, East Kazakhstan Region, Kazakhstan	6.0	0.0		Nuclear test.		
26	United Kingdom, Cumbria, England	4.5	10.0	VI	Some minor damage was caused in the area.		
