= Kuran Islands =

Island group in Papua, Indonesia

Coordinates: 1.7936985°S 135.7619166°E

The Kuran Islands (Kepulauan Kuran) are a group of small scattered islands, and part of the Yapen Islands archipelago in Papua Province of Western New Guinea, northeastern Indonesia.

They are located off the southwestern coast of Yapen Island in Cenderawasih Bay.

The Ambai Islands archipelago is to the east.

== See also ==
- Cenderawasih Bay topics
- Islands of Western New Guinea
