= Marthen Douw =

Indonesian politician

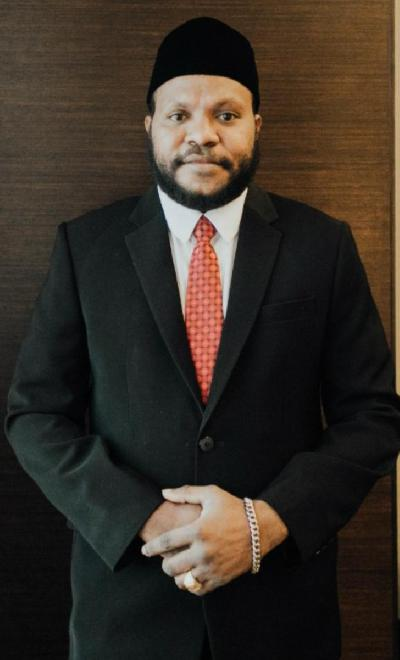
- Born: March 2, 1990; Nabire
- Occupation: Politician
- Political party: National Awakening Party
- Position held: Member of the People's Representative Council of Indonesia (2019–2024), Member of the Regional Representative Council of Indonesia (2014–2019)

Marthen Douw is a politician from Papua. He was elected as a member of the Indonesian Parliament for 2019–2024. He is the only member of the National Awakening Party from the national electoral district of Papua. Despite his young age, he was a member of the Regional Representative Council of the Nabire Regency for the period 2014–2019.

== Career ==
In 2019, he was elected as a member of the People's Representative Council. He is on Commission VII focusing on energy, research and technology and natural environment.

On September 1, 2020, Marthen Douw requested the People's Representative Council to extend the time to discuss Papua's special autonomy status.
