= Korwar =

West Papuan ancestor carvings

Korwar figures from Northwest New Guinea.

Korwars are carved wooden figures believed in West Papuan custom to serve as intermediaries between the spirit world and the world of the living. Korwars were often consulted for general advice, to assist in healing a sick family member, to bring about favorable weather conditions, or to promote success in fertility, hunting, and headhunting. These statues are believed to contain the soul of a deceased relative, and were created to serve this function. Korwars could also be discarded if the deceased's soul had apparently departed from the figure, and in these cases the korwar was taken to a place where its wood would decompose. One Dutch missionary account reports that korwars representing firstborns were carved from harder, less decomposable wood, while all others were carved of softer wood. Some sources describe a tradition, especially among better-off families, whereby small wooden houses were carved and left in the forest for the deceased spirit to reside in before moving into the korwar.

Korwars were meant to represent a specific deceased person, and were created to house one of the two souls that each person posses in traditional West Papuan cosmology. A korwar can hold the spirit which will remain to advise the family members and community, while the other spirit of the deceased will continue to the "abode of the dead," which is said to be located in the Milky Way. Ancestors chosen for containment in korwars were often particularly important figures, such as the leader of a clan or family, or persons who died suddenly or prematurely. In the latter case, preservation in a korwar was done in order to prevent the spirit from haunting the family. Missionary sources suggest that a korwar was carved for one in eight deaths.

Korwars are small, ranging from a few centimeters ("handheld size") to two feet in length. Some korwars, typically older specimens, contain the skull of the deceased person, either in an enclosed chamber, or as a visible adornment. Van Baaren reports that stone korwars exist, but are very rare. The "korwar style" of carving, typical of northwest New Guinea, is characterized by the "near-ubiquitous" formal qualities of the figures. These are: deep-set eyes, an anchor- or arrow-shaped nose, and an oversized, finely-detailed head with a flat underside, with figures depicted either standing or sitting on a rounded base. Raymond Corbey writes that the sitting posture "may be related to the tradition of burying the corpse in a seated position with the knees held against the breast, in a plaited mat." This is linked to a belief that the dead sit on an Underworld beach to gaze at the land of the living. Korwars often hold "shields, fences, or smaller anthropomorphic figures which are incised with elegant openwork". This style was employed not only in korwars, but also in everyday items such as tools and bowls. Scholars divide korwars into either three or five regions of production with distinctive qualities. The five-region model places four "along the coast and islands of Cenderawasih Bay, and the fifth ... on a small archipelago west of New Guinea."

A korwar from Cenderawasih Bay containing the skull of the deceased in a closed wooden chamber.

The etymology of korwar is unsettled. Proposed etymologies include derivations from kar (transl. to cut; to carve; to fell a tree), kor kwar (transl. they are already bones), and the root lowa, lawa (signifying "all things connected to the underworld"). A lack of written records, coupled with the frequent physical decay and deliberate destruction of korwars, means that the tradition's development is unknown. No anthropologists ever witnessed their creation, but it is known that the figures were carved by religious master carvers. Some korwars were destroyed by West Papuans who were dissatisfied with the outcome of their consultations with the statues, and others were detroyed en masse by Dutch missionaries after their arrival in the mid-19th century. According to researcher Frans-Karel Weener, korwars as a fixture in West Papuan culture in the Cenderawasih Bay area gradually became obsolete in favor of Christianity at the beginning of the 20th century, and when villages were converted, the Papuans would either burn their korwars, throw them in the ocean, or surrender them to the missionaries. An image dated to July 1937 shows korwars still in use in northern Waigeo. The Dutch missionary Frans van Hasselt described a mass surrender of korwars in 1907:

After my sermon, almost everyone got up, only to come back a short while later with … 68 korwars that people were prepared to relinquish … I had in the past tried several times to buy these images for museums, I even offered large sums for them, but always without success … and now here they lay at my feet and people had brought them willingly to me

— Frans van Hasselt, 13 May 1908

Korwars were reportedly feared by neighboring non-korwar-producing cultures, who believed that the figures had the power to bring about illness or death.

Dutch colonial authorities outlawed korwars as pagan objects, and they are no longer made. Raymond Corbey estimates that there were slightly over 3,000 korwars carved between 1870 and 1930, and approximately 800 specimens survive, spread across institutional and private collections. Some of these, he writes are korwar kaku (genuine ritual korwars), while others are korwar wawerik (carvings made to be sold, distinguishable by their lack of signs of wear). He estimates that, not counting korwar wawerik, there are 600 surviving genuine korwars.

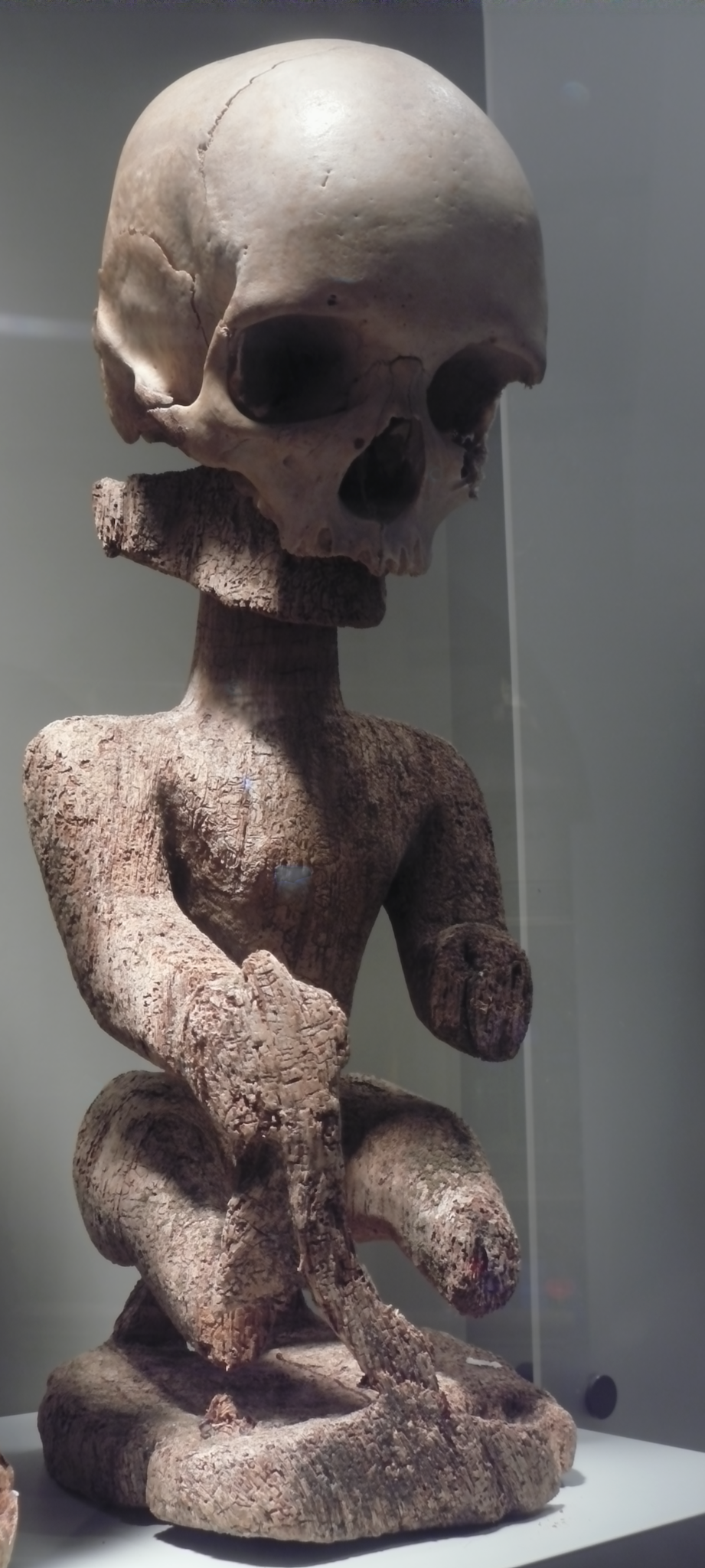
A korwar where the skull of the deceased is used as an adornment to the wooden figure.
