= Yapen rain forests =

Ecoregion in Indonesia

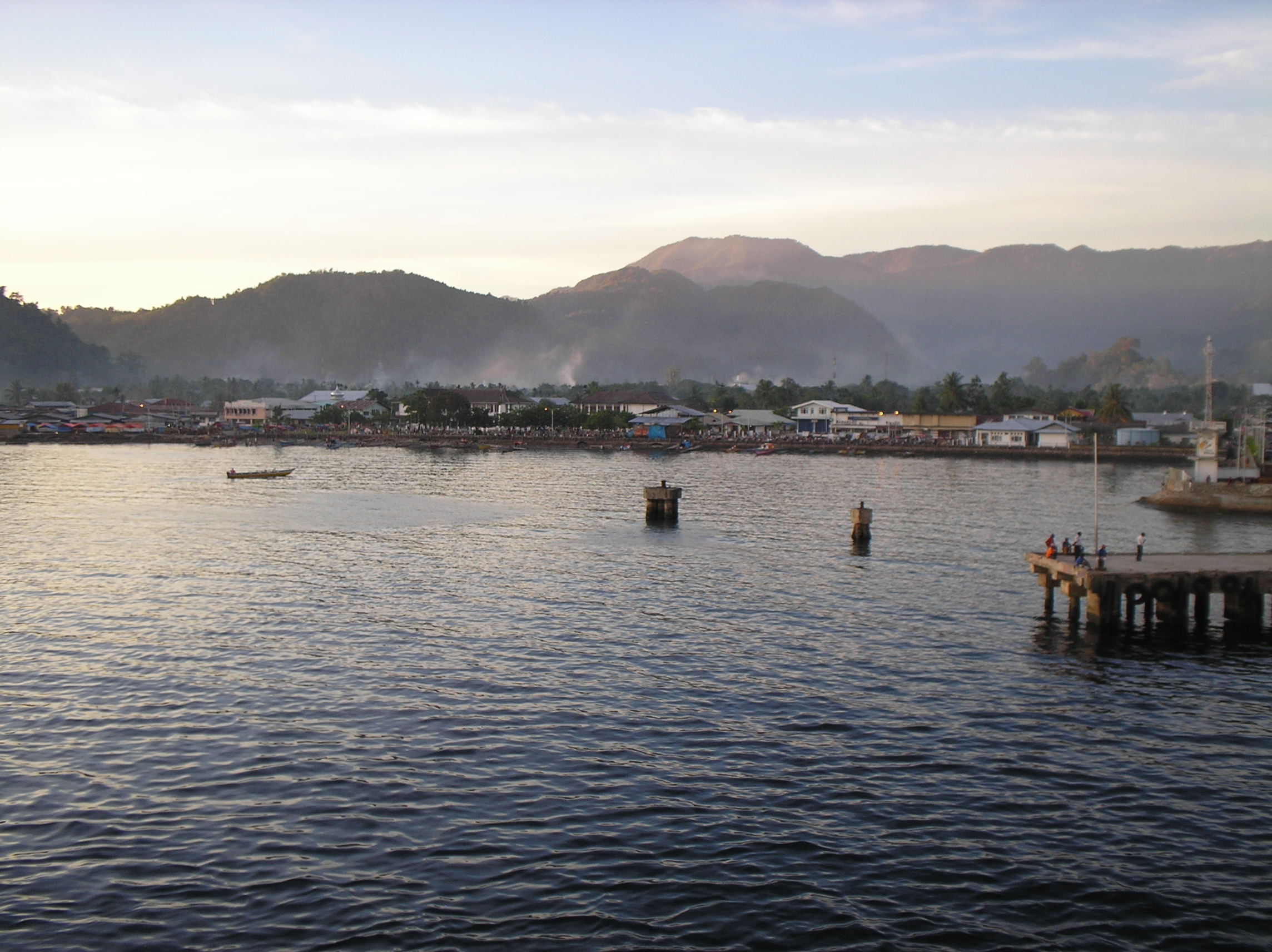
- Yapen

- Location of the ecoregion in Western New Guinea

Ecology
- Realm: Australasian realm
- Biome: tropical and subtropical moist broadleaf forests

Geography
- Area: 2,423 km^{2} (936 sq mi)
- Countries: Indonesia
- Province: Papua
- Coordinates: 1.5°S 136.1°E

Conservation
- Conservation status: Critical/endangered
- Protected: 48.31%

The Yapen rain forests is a tropical moist forest ecoregion in Indonesia. The ecoregion covers the island of Yapen and smaller neighboring islands which lie north of New Guinea.

== Geography ==
The ecoregion covers the island of Yapen, and the smaller islands of Mios Num to the northwest and Kurudu to the east.

Yapen covers an area of 2,230 km^{2}. The island is long and narrow, extending 166 km east and west and only 26 km north to south at the island's widest point. Hills and mountains run the length of the island. The highest peak is 1,430 m.

The surface geology is limestone and plutonic rocks, including outcrops of ultramafic rock.

The islands were connected to New Guinea during the ice ages when the sea level was lower, and shares many plants and animals with the adjacent mainland.

== Climate ==
The ecoregion has a tropical rain forest climate.

== Flora ==
The original vegetation was tropical wet evergreen forest. Forests consisted of three main types, alluvial forests in flatlands and river valleys, and hill forest on the hillsides, and montane forests at higher elevations.

Dominant trees on the coastal strand are Terminalia catappa, Barringtonia asiatica, Calophyllum inophyllum, Artocarpus sp., and Casuarina sp. Swamp forests of Nipa palm (Nypa fruticans) are common behind the shore. Palaquium amboinense, Octomeles sumatrana, Intsia bijuga, Ficus benjamina, and species of Eugenia and Artocarpus cover lowland slopes. Palaquium amboinense, Octomeles sumatrana, Calophyllum sp., Terminalia sp., Manilkara sp., Pometia acuminata, and Pometia pinnata predominate in lowland forests further inland, with Anisoptera thurifera polyandra as an emergent tree in scattered locations.

Characteristic trees of the highlands include Pometia acuminata, Palaquium amboinense, and species of Cryptocarya, Tristania, and Calophyllum. The conifer Araucaria cunninghamii is an emergent tree found in scattered mountain locations above 500 meters elevation.

Ultramafic rocks contain concentrations of metals which are toxic to many plants, and the ultramafic outcrops host unique plant communities adapted to ultramafic soils.

== Fauna ==
The ecoregion is home to 37 mammal species. Two limited-range species are shared with the Biak–Numfoor rain forests ecoregion, which covers the islands north of Yapen: the Japen rat (Rattus jobiensis) is found on Yapen and the islands of Biak and Supiori, and the Geelvink Bay flying fox (Pteropus pohlei), a fruit bat, is found on Yapen and the islands of Numfor and Rani.

147 bird species live in the ecoregion. There are no strictly endemic bird species. About 120 species live in the lowlands, and 26 species live in the uplands. The montane forests are home to the Green-backed robin (Pachycephalopsis hattamensis), which also lives in New Guinea's Central and Vogelkop highlands. The island's largest bird is the Northern cassowary (Casuarius unappendiculatus).

== Protected areas ==
48.31% of the ecoregion is in protected areas. Yapen Tengah Nature Reserve is the largest protected area in the ecoregion, covering 590.0 km^{2} in the center of the island.
