= Bali earthquake =

Bali earthquake may refer to:

- 1815 Bali earthquake
- 1917 Bali earthquake
- 1976 Bali earthquake
- 1979 Bali earthquake
- 2004 Bali earthquake
- 2021 Bali earthquake
