= Kurudu Island =

Island in Yapen Islands Regency, Papua Province, Indonesia

Kurudu
- Interactive map of Kurudu

Geography
- Location: Melanesia; Oceania
- Coordinates: 1°50′35″S 137°00′30″E
- Area: 20.18 km^{2} (7.79 sq mi)

Administration
- Indonesia
- Province: Papua
- Regency: Yapen Islands

Demographics
- Population: 1,687 (mid 2024 estimate)
- Pop. density: 83.6/km^{2} (216.5/sq mi)
- Ethnic groups: Kurudu and Kaipuri

Additional information
- Time zone: Indonesia Eastern Standard Time (UTC+09:00)

Kurudu Island is an island which lies east of Yapen Island in Cenderawasih Bay, lying off the north coast of Papua Province of Indonesia. It covers an area of 20.18 km^{2} and had a population of 1,585 at the 2020 Census; the official estimate as at mid 2024 was 1,687. Administratively, the island forms a district (distrik) within the Yapen Islands Regency, and is sub-divided into 8 villages (desa) of which the administrative centre is Kirimbri. Its inhabitants speak the Kurudu language, one of the Yapen languages.

== History ==
Kurudu Island, or known as Miobo Krudu by local peoples, is one of the islands included in the Yapen Islands, Papua province. It is said that this island was known in the past as a supplier of goods, both between fellow Papuan traders and with traders from outside. This can be known through various records of Europeans who have visited this island during the Dutch East India Company era until the arrival of the Dutch colonial government in New Guinea.

Since the 16th century, the island of Kurudu was recorded by the Spanish under the name La Ballena in 1545. Although it had been explored in that year, there is not much information about Kurudu Island. Entering the 18th century, this island was written about in European books, about the trading aspects they had observed there. Sir Thomas Forrest visited the island in February 1775, in English he called it "Island of Krudo". He also wrote that the Kurudu–Kaipuri people used to collect turtle shells to trade with Chinese traders. The areas of Yapen, Waropen, and Nabire were places where Chinese, Buginese, Makassarese, Seram (Moluccans), and Europeans traders conducted barter with the inhabitants of the region.

The Kurudu people produce a variety of local products including clay pottery (sempe), carvings, boats, and sago which will later be traded to various places on the north coast of Papua. The Kurudu people also had a trade network extending to the Mamberamo River and extending to Tanah Tabi lit. 'Land of Tabi' (Jayapura City and Jayapura Regency). For example, the Kurudu people brought products such as beads, knives, plates, and exchanged them with the Mamberamo people.

The Evangelism on Kurudu Island was carried out in 1929 by Laurens Tanamal, The journey of the Evangelist Laurens Tanamal was recorded by the priest Albert Jan de Neef in a novel entitled Di Tapal Batas: Mambu Ransar, Alex Runggeary's work published by Nas Media Pustaka in Makassar on 2022.

== Demographics ==
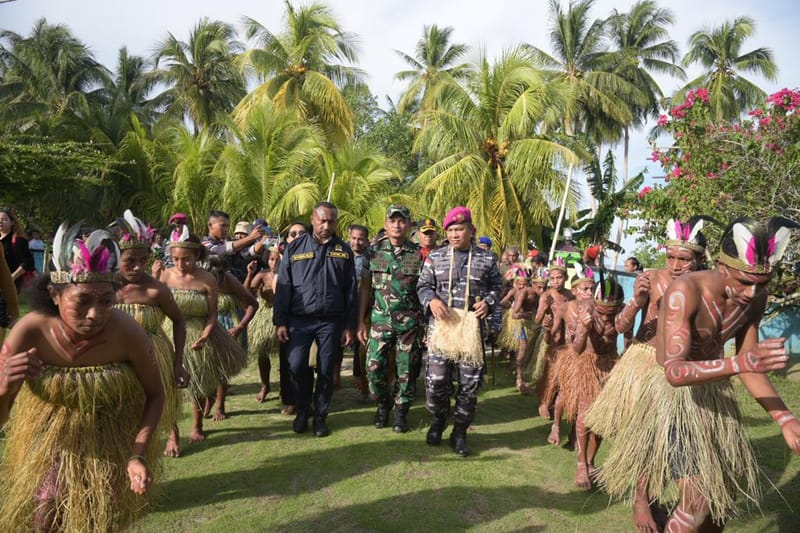
Traditional dance of the Kurudu people on Kurudu Island to welcome member of Commission I of the DPR RI, Yan Permenas Mandenas on his visit in 2023.

Kurudu Island is inhabited by two ethnic groups, namely the Kurudu people in the north of the island and the Kaipuri people in the south of the island. The majority of the population adheres to Christianity.

== Geography ==
This island is the natural boundary point of four regencies, namely Yapen Islands Regency (this island place), Mamberamo Raya Regency, Waropen Regency, and Biak Numfor Regency. As an island in the Pacific Ocean, Kurudu Island is surrounded by high, large ocean waves and strong tidal currents.
