= Anggrameos Island =

Island in Central Papua Province, Indonesia

Coordinates: 2°42′10″S 134°49′52″E

Anggrameos is an island (class T - Hypsographic) in Nabire Regency, part of the Indonesian province of Central Papua. It lies in Cenderawasih Bay and has a maximum elevation of 139 metres above sea level. It is part of the Teluk Cenderawasih National Park protected area.

Anggrameos is also known as Angra Eiland or Angra Meos.
