= Kurudu language =

Language in Papua

Kurudu
- Native to: Indonesia
- Region: Papua
- Ethnicity: Kurudu
- Native speakers: (2,200 cited 1993)
- Language family: Austronesian: Malayo-Polynesian; Central–Eastern Malayo-Polynesian; Eastern Malayo-Polynesian; South Halmahera–West New Guinea; Cenderawasih Bay; Yapen; Eastern; Kurudu

Language codes
- ISO 639-3: kjr
- Glottolog: kuru1305

Kurudu is an Eastern Yapen language of the Malayo-Polynesian languages, in Papua Province of Western New Guinea, northeastern Indonesia.

It is spoken by the people in Kurudu Island, located in Cenderawasih Bay between Serui Island of the Yapen Islands, and the New Guinea mainland.
