= 1979 Saint Elias earthquake =

Earthquake in Alaska

- Location within Alaska
- UTC time: 1979-02-28 21:27:06
- ISC event: 670396
- USGS-ANSS: ComCat
- Local date: 28 February 1979
- Local time: 12:27:06 AKST
- Magnitude: M_{w} 7.5
- Depth: 15.0 km (9.3 mi)
- Epicenter: Chugach Mountains and Saint Elias Mountains, 60.642°N 141.593°W
- Type: Thrust
- Areas affected: Alaska, Yukon
- Total damage: Limited
- Max. intensity: MMI VII (Very strong)
- Peak acceleration: 0.16 g
- Aftershocks: Yes
- Casualties: None

The 1979 Saint Elias earthquake affected southeastern Alaska at 12:27 AKST on 28 February. The thrust-faulting M_{w} 7.5 earthquake had an epicenter in the east of the Chugach Mountains. The earthquake occurred along an uncertain plate boundary where previous large earthquakes have occurred. Though the maximum recorded Modified Mercalli intensity was VII (Very strong), damage was minimal and there were no casualties due to the remoteness of the faulting. The shaking was widespread and the damage also extended across the border to parts of Yukon, Canada.

== Tectonic setting ==
In the Saint Elias region, the North American plate and Yakutat Terrane converge with the Pacific plate at rates of 45–50 mm (1.8–2.0 in)/yr. The Pacific plate undergoes subduction beneath North America along the Aleutian Trench west of the Saint Elias area, while strike-slip faulting between the two plates occurs to the east on the Queen Charlotte Fault. Faults in the Saint Elias region exhibit thrust and reverse slip while there is localised strike-slip deformation evident in some earthquake fault plane solutions. In the area of the epicenter, several surface faults exist that may have slipped during the earthquake. The Saint Elias area represents a transition zone between the convergent and strike-slip plate motions. This area was also the location of a series of large earthquakes in 1899. Aside from the earthquake of 1979, no other major earthquakes have occurred in the Saint Elias region since 1899, and the 1964 and 1958 earthquakes ruptured adjacent segments of the plate boundary. This part of the plate boundary, dubbed the Yakataga Gap, extends 250 km (160 mi) across, where great earthquakes of magnitude 8.0 or larger have a recurrence interval of 80 years. Only a section of this gap ruptured during the 1979 earthquake.

== Earthquake ==
The earthquake, which occurred at a shallow depth of 15.0 km (9.3 mi), was the largest to strike the continental United States since 1964. It measured 7.5 on the moment magnitude scale (M_{w}), while on the surface-wave magnitude scale (M_{s}), measured between 7.1 and 7.7. The earthquake occurred beneath the Chugach and Saint Elias ranges and was observed by 50 seismic stations in Southeast Alaska.

=== Geology ===
Beneath the Saint Elias range, the Pacific plate and possibly the Yakutat Block subduct at a rate of 5.3 cm (2.1 in) annually. The earthquake occurred in this region, known as Yakataga, where a seismic gap was previously identified. This gap represented a section of the subduction zone where no large earthquakes have occurred since the 1899 Yakutat Bay earthquakes. Adjacent sections of the subduction zone ruptured during the 1964 and the 1958 earthquakes. While the 1979 earthquake occurred on this seismic gap, it did not fully rupture the entirety of it. Therefore, a possible seismic gap remains west of the 1979 and east of the 1964 ruptures.

A focal mechanism analysis suggest shallow thrust and strike-slip faulting was responsible for the earthquake. The rupture initiated on a thrust fault that dipped to the north and propagated east-southeast on the fault before transitioning onto a separate northeast-dipping dextral fault. The distribution of aftershocks in the area suggest a maximum rupture dimension of approximately 65 km (40 mi) by 80 km (50 mi) and extending southeast of the epicenter. Part of the rupture extended beneath Canada's Yukon Territory. There was no foreshock activity, and the largest aftershock measured M_{w} 5.2. The largest aftershocks displayed a variety of focal mechanisms involving thrust, strike-slip, and normal faulting. The earthquake caused 0.4–1.0 m (1 ft 4 in – 3 ft 3 in) of movement on the fault; only a portion (10–30%) of the total slip accumulated since the 1899 events.

== Impact ==
The earthquake occurred in the sparsely populated and glaciated Chugach Range. It was felt the strongest, VII (Very strong) on the Mercalli intensity scale, at Icy Bay Lumber Camp, 73 km (45 mi) away, where a logging truck bounced violently. A March 2 aerial reconnaissance flight did not find major damage within 40 km (25 mi) of the epicenter. Damage to drywall and plaster, and displaced furniture, were observed in Mendenhall, Haines, Border City, Juneau, and Cape Yakataga. At Border City, a wooden building situated on permafrost was displaced at its base. Two fractures appeared in the concrete floor of a restaurant in Yakutat. Wallboards cracked at Valdez Airport, though the building did not sustain structural damage. Many people in the airport reported difficulty standing up. Likewise, at Juneau Airport, passengers disembarking a plane struggled to stand and a heavy desk in the terminal was shaken.

In Yukon Territory, fractures appeared in the local school wall at Beaver Creek. A building in Burwash Landing sustained cracks while cracked plasters appeared in a lodge at Destruction Bay. The shaking was widespread, with people reportedly feeling the earthquake 1,200 km (750 mi) away, and shaking being felt over a distance of 500,000 km^{2} (190,000 sq mi). In Iowa, some wells reported water level fluctuations of up to 1.42 ft (0.43 m).

Three accelerographs located within 250 km (160 mi) of the epicenter recorded strong ground motion data from the earthquake. A peak horizontal acceleration of 0.16 g recorded in Icy Bay, 74 km (46 mi) away, was the highest recorded ground motion. Yakutat recorded peak horizontal acceleration of 0.09 g. The Alyeska Pipeline Service Company also recorded digital ground motion data in Valdez using their accelerographs, with peak horizontal acceleration there being 0.013 g.

At Sitka, a 6 in (150 mm) tsunami was recorded while a 2 in (51 mm) tsunami occurred in Yakutat. An erroneous entry that was included in a 1979 report stated that a 30 cm (12 in) tsunami was recorded. Many snow avalanches were observed aerially to the south and southeast of the epicentral region. On the Saint Elias range, between Mount Huxley and Mount Augusta, severe avalanches travelled more than 1 mi (1.6 km) away from the north face of the range. Multiple large (6–10×10^{6} m^{3}) rock avalanches fell from slopes near the Seward Glacier. Many large (3–5 km^{2} (1.2–1.9 sq mi)) landslides also occurred. The mainshock and aftershock distribution on land suggest the tsunami was triggered by a small and local landslide. After a couple of months, earthquake activity died down and resembled the regional stress field before the mainshock.

== See also ==
- List of earthquakes in 1979
- List of earthquakes in the United States
- List of earthquakes in Alaska
- List of earthquakes in Canada
