= 1979 Ghaenat earthquakes =

Earthquake sequence in Iran

- Location within Iran
- UTC time: 1979-11-14 02:21:22
- 1979-11-27 17:10:32
- 1979-12-07 09:24:00
- ISC event
- 655622
- 656234
- 653814
- USGS-ANSS: ComCat
- ComCat
- ComCat
- Local date: November 14, 1979
- November 27, 1979
- Magnitude: 6.6 M_{s}, 6.8 M_{w}
- 7.1 M_{s}, 7.2 M_{w}
- Depth: 7.9 km
- Epicenter: 33.962°N 59.726°E
- Type: Strike-slip
- Areas affected: Iran
- Max. intensity: MMI X (Extreme)
- Aftershocks: Many. Largest is a M_{s}6.0
- Casualties: 297–440 dead, 279 injured

The 1979 Ghaenat earthquakes were a series of large earthquakes in Qaen County, Khorasan province, northeast Iran, near the Afghanistan border. The first mainshock, known as the Korizan earthquake with a surface-wave magnitude (M_{s}) of 6.6 and moment magnitude (M_{w}) of 6.8, struck on November 14, while the M_{s} 7.1 or M_{w} 7.2 Koli-Boniabad earthquake struck on November 27. The two mainshocks were assigned a maximum Modified Mercalli intensity of VIII (Severe) and X (Extreme), respectively. The earthquakes caused extensive damage throughout northeastern Iran, killing an estimated 297 to 440 people and left at least 279 injured.

== Tectonic setting ==
Iran is situated within the Alpide belt, an active orogenic belt that spans the entire country. This tectonic environment is influenced by the oblique collision of the Arabian and Eurasian Plates at an estimated rate of 22 mm/yr. Iran itself is situated on the Eurasian plate, where it hosts complex zones of faults, forming tectonic blocks within the country. In southeastern Iran, the Arabian plate subducts beneath Iran along the Makran Trench. Shallow strike-slip and reverse faulting accommodate deformation in eastern Iran. Crustal shortening and thickening occur at fold and thrust belts along the Zagros, Alborz, and Kopet Dag ranges. Intraplate deformation occur, mainly displaying reverse faulting at the southern and northern parts of Iran to accommodate the convergence via crustal uplift, and strike-slip faulting at the east and western ends, where the Arabian plate slides past the adjacent crust. The tectonic setting contributes to shallow seismicity.

== Earthquakes ==
The earthquake of November 27 was the strongest in the area since 1968. Between 1968 and 1979, the area was hit by strong earthquakes including a M_{w}6.0 in 1976. Another large M_{s}6.7 or M_{w}6.5 shock on January 16, 1979, killing 200 people in the town of Bonzonabad. The source fault of that event has not been identified yet although the Boznabad and Pavak faults were possible candidates.

=== Korizan earthquake ===
The M_{s}6.6 or M_{w}6.8 earthquake of November 14 was the result of rupturing the Abiz Fault, a north–south striking, right-lateral strike-slip fault at a shallow depth of 9.2 km (5.7 mi) for a length of 20 km (12 mi). A maximum horizontal slip of 1 m (3 ft 3 in) and some vertical displacements were recorded during field surveys after the earthquake. The southern section of the earthquake surface rupture would move once again during the 1997 Qayen earthquake. The 125 km (78 mi)-long Abiz Fault ruptured in its entirety during the M_{w}7.1 earthquake of 1997. There were no prior recorded rupture before the 20th century.

=== Koli-Boniabad earthquake ===
The November 27 M_{s}7.1 mainshock occurred as a result of strike-slip faulting for a length of 60 km (37 mi) along the left-lateral Dasht-e-Bayaz Fault. It had an estimated moment magnitude (M_{w}) of 7.1–7.2. This mainshock had a hypocenter depth of 7.9 km (4.9 mi). The second rupture is nearly perpendicular to the prior rupture. The same fault produced another deadly M_{s}7.1 earthquake in 1968 to the west northwest. The 1968 earthquake ruptured the western section for the fault for about 80 km (50 mi) in length. At least 10 km (6.2 mi) of the 1968 rupture was involved in the 1979 event. The both earthquakes displayed strike-slip focal mechanisms.

A maximum vertical surface displacement of 3.90 m (12.8 ft), and horizontal surface displacement of 2.55 m (8 ft 4 in) was measured, respectively. The epicenter located at the eastern end of the surface rupture zone suggest the fault rupture propagated westward. The eastern end of the rupture was also the intersection point of the Abiz Fault's (source of the November 14 event) northern termination. During this mainshock, the northern termination of the November 14 event ruptured further northeast, joining the eastern section of the second rupture. The November 14 and December 7 earthquakes ruptured approximately 35 km (22 mi) of the Abiz Fault. It was involved in a M_{s}6.0 earthquake in 1936 which produced 8–12 km (5.0–7.5 mi) of surface rupture.

=== Kalat-e-Shur earthquake ===
Another earthquake measuring M_{s}6.0 or M_{w}6.1 on December 7 was initially thought to have caused a 15 km (9.3 mi) long surface rupture to the north. The aftershock would have extended the rupture length of the Abiz Fault to a total of 35 km (22 mi), but these ruptures may have also formed during a subevent of the M_{w}7.2 shock. It is unlikely that the 15 km (9.3 mi) of new surface ruptures were attributed to the M_{w}5.9 mainshock, due to its moderate magnitude. The earthquake has been suggested to be on a separate north–south striking structure, away from the Abiz Fault.

== Impact ==
The earthquake damaged or destroyed mainly adobe-constructed buildings of the sun-dried clay type. Strong ground motion mainly of horizontal fashion caused many walls of these structures to completely detach from its roof, resulting in a collapse. More recent construction of single-storey buildings suffered small damage and were mostly intact. In one village located along a hill, the most serious damage was observed at the summit, and appear to decrease in severity downhill, suggesting the seismic waves produced by the earthquake was amplified and reflected at higher elevations on the hill. This subjected structures at the top of the hill with more intense shaking than those on lower elevations.

Between 280 and 420 people died, with a further 279 injured in the November 14 earthquake. Many villages were also badly damaged in the earthquake. The earthquake struck at 5:51 local time (IST) when many adult villagers were outside their homes harvesting saffron. Most of the dead were reportedly young children left at home while their adult family members were working in the saffron fields.

The second earthquake destroyed 10 villages. Survivors of the earthquakes were relocated to other areas while some damaged villages were rebuilt by the government in the same place. The second mainshock only resulted in 20 additional deaths and injured 24 people. The death toll from the second earthquake was smaller due to the low population density of the area when the quake struck.

== See also ==
- List of earthquakes in Iran
- List of earthquakes in 1979
