= Serui Kota =

City in Papua, Indonesia

Serui
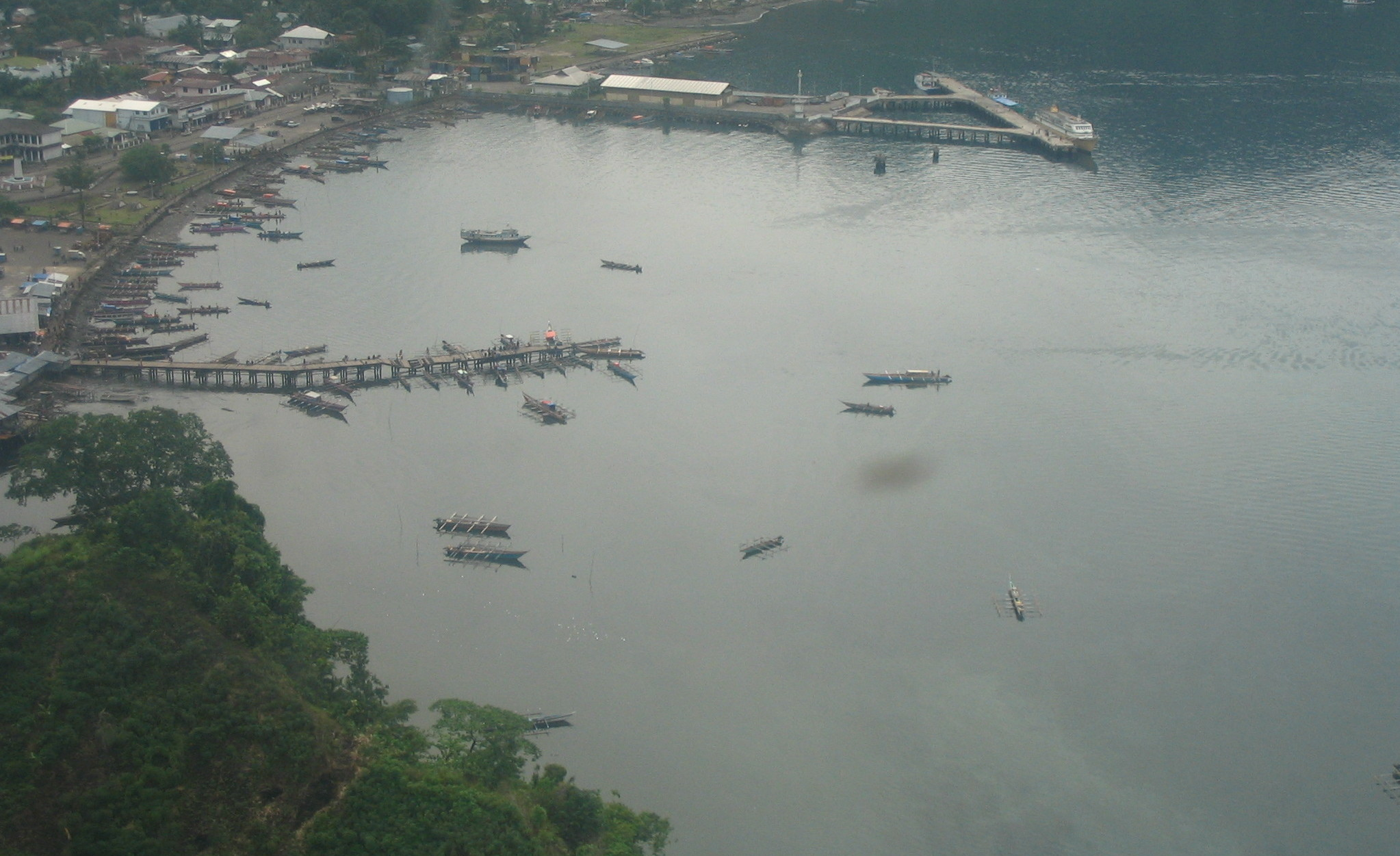
- The port of Serui from above.

- Location within Indonesia
- Coordinates: 1.878°S 136.237°E
- Country: Indonesia
- Province: Papua
- Regency: Yapen Islands Regency
- District: Yapen Selatan

Area
  - Total: 50.19 km^{2} (19.38 sq mi)

Population (mid 2024 estimate)
  - Total: 52,044
  - Density: 1,037/km^{2} (2,686/sq mi)

Languages
- Time zone: UTC+9 (WIT)
- Climate: Af

Serui Kota (called "Seroei" in Dutch) is a town and the capital of the Yapen Islands Regency of Papua, Indonesia. As of 2024, the 26.39 km^{2} district containing the town (Distrik Yapen Selatan) had a population of 36,286, while the adjacent 23.80 km^{2} Distrik Anataurei (part of the urban area, and previously part of the same district) had a population of 15,758. It is located on the south coast of the island of Yapen in Cenderawasih Bay to the north of Papua.
