= Ambai language =

Austronesian language

Ambai
- Native to: Indonesia
- Region: Ambai Islands
- Ethnicity: Ambai
- Native speakers: (10,100 cited 2000)
- Language family: Austronesian: Malayo-Polynesian; Central–Eastern Malayo-Polynesian; Eastern Malayo-Polynesian; South Halmahera–West New Guinea; Cenderawasih Bay; Yapen; Central–Western; Ambai

Language codes
- ISO 639-3: amk
- Glottolog: amba1265

The Ambai or Ampari is an Austronesian language spoken by the Ambai people in Indonesian New Guinea (Papua Province), mostly on the Ambai Islands, as well as the southern part of Yapen Island. The number of speakers is estimated to be 10,000. Dialects are Randawaya, Ambai (Wadapi-Laut), and Manawi.

== Phonology ==
Ambai has 19 consonants and 6 vowels, shown on the tables below.

Consonants
	Bilabial	Alveolar	Palatal	Velar	Laryngeal
Plosive	p b	t d		k ɡ	
Nasal	m	n		ŋ	
Trill		r			
Fricative	ɸ	s	ç ʝ		ħ/h
Approximant	w		j		

Vowels
	Front	Central	Back
Close	i		u
Mid	ɛ	ə	ɔ
Open		a	

== Morphology ==
=== Pronouns ===
All pronouns in Ambai mark for number, person and clusivity (in first person).

The following bound pronouns are obligatorily added as affixes to the verb to stand as the subject of the sentence. Every verb in Ambai takes a subject, even if it is a 'dummy' third-person pronoun.

Bound Pronouns
		Singular	Dual	Trial	Plural
1st person	exclusive	i-/dj-	au(r)-	anto(r)-	ame(r)-
1st person	inclusive	i-/dj-	tu(r)-	to(r)-	ta(r)-
2nd person		b-	mu(r)-	munto(r)-	me(r)-
3rd person		d-	u(r)-	co(r)-	e(r)-

The following pronouns are independent and are more restricted in use. They do not appear as subjects – since the subject is marked already on the verb – but can appear as objects, in prepositional phrases and in subordinate clauses. Some verbs allow the object pronoun to be omitted.

Free Pronouns
		Singular	Dual	Trial	Plural
1st person	exclusive	jau	auru	antoru	amea
1st person	inclusive	jau	turu	totoro	tata
2nd person		wau	muru	muntoro	mea
3rd person		i	uru	coru	ea

Examples of pronouns used in everyday language:

b-oti suru
2SG-see 3DU.OBJ
'Look at them (two).'

uru u-minohi
3DU 3DU-sit
'They sit.'
