= Ambai Archipelago =

Archipelago in Papua, Indonesia

Ambai (Indonesian: kepulauan Ambai) are the archipelago or the chain of islands off the southern coast of Yapen Island, in Cenderawasih Bay and Papua Province in Western New Guinea, northeastern Indonesia.

== Islands ==
The archipelago has five main islands, including Ambai and Saweru. There are seven medium-size islands and more than 15 smaller islands. The land area of the islands is 32.51 square kilometres (12.55 square miles). They comprise two administrative districts (distrik) of Yapen Islands Regency; to the west, Nusawani District encompasses Saweru Island and smaller islands to its south; the administrative centre is in the village of Perea. To the east, Ambai Islands District covers the rest of the archipelago; its administrative centre is in the village of Ambai.

Locations of major islands in the Cenderawasih Bay:

- 1.928851°S 136.348598°E Ambai Island
- 1.913230°S 136.287851°E Saweru Island
- 1.00°S 136.00°E Biak
- 0.75446°S 135.6050°E Supiori Island
- 1.73089°S 136.00°E Yapen

=== Marine Park ===
The Ambai Islands include part of Cenderawasih Bay Marine Park which is the largest marine national park in Indonesia with an area of 1,453.5 km^{2}. Because of its breadth, the park is divided into sections. Among them are "Padaido Islands Marine Park" in the east of Biak, the "Ambai Islands Marine" Park in southern Yapen, the "Harleem Islands Marine Park" in northeast Nabire, and lastly the "Cenderawasih Bay Marine Park" in the north of Wondama Bay.

== Biodiversity ==
Generally, the Ambai Islands region has its own characteristics and includes part of the biodiversity on the Yapen islands, including forests and hills, as well as trees species such as boat trees (pohon kayu perahu), trees to make traditional wooden drums and traditional guitars including ukulele and string bass, ironwood, bitangur, palm, katapang, coconut trees.

Some of the bird species in the islands include the bird of paradise, parrots, kakatua raja, kakatua, taun-taun, eagle, wood pigeon, cassowary, forest chicken and others. Some of the other fauna found includes wild pig, kuskus, snake, lizard, butterfly and others. The life within coral reefs has hundreds of species of fish and other marine life local to the islands.

== People ==
The Ambai people, when overseas and remembering their ancestral homeland, often call it "munu fai" — in Bahasa it is kampung leluhur/kampung halaman. The Ambai are a sub-tribe of Melanesia. 'Nu Ambai' or 'Village Ambai'.

The island's name, when translated literally from their language, means "Moon". This is due to the similarity of the word "moon" in the Ambai language, which is embai. So embai became "Ambai". And thus, "Ambai" is the more familiar word used by their ancient ancestors and until now. Ambai peoples with speech intonation of their native language is very dynamic; it is dynamic in social interaction with others. The number of speakers is estimated to be 10,000 mostly in the core peoples of the Ambai Islands as well as the southern and eastern part of the Yapen Islands.

=== Culture ===
The inhabitants of the islands live mostly on houses built on stilts off shore, and speak the Ambai language.

The beaches are iconic places for the Ambai peoples as culture. They fished with nets and traditional diving. They cook and eat together, by the manner of their traditional picnic from a long time ago. Ambai peoples have a culture of men as fishermen and sailors; the women are skilled in gardening and farming. Ambai peoples are indigenous Papuans renowned as accomplished fishermen in the region and around the Cenderawasih ocean bay.

Progress since the early 1960s until now, Ambai peoples who wander in some areas on the north coast of Papua are known as very accomplished fishermen who contribute to the distribution of the fish is in the cities, like Serui, Jayapura, Biak, Nabire, Manokwari, Sorong. "My Ancestors were Seafarers" is a motto embedded in the minds of Ambai peoples until today.

Peoples of Ambai have distinctive cultural dancing and singing with drum beats is usually displayed in the custom party event "Mandohi". Mandohi is the tradition of the payback party (pesta adat balas budi baik) from someone on the kindness of relatives and family. By providing a wealth of indigenous utensils, antique plates, jars, beads and foods laid out on the stage to dance and sing in speech language Ambai, "Rayato, Anuai, Bewi and Apaiwariai". Quite often the parents who have high ability, mastering languages of other tribes, enrich it with singing of several languages of Cenderawasih Bay; Wandamen language, for example. Ambai peoples are known as a poet traditional boat and singer of traditional boats. Singing and poetry on a boat with Ambai language utterances do when returning from fishing or gardening. Poetry that was sung in the dusk in the stories to the memory of the natural resources and the beauty of the Ambai islands.

Ambai people have a custom event celebration, welcoming a kindred who recently returned from a place far away and for the first time he went, called "Aira". Aira is also held to welcome important guests. Ritual Aira was done with the "tread plate" antique or stepped on the antique plate that mats with a count of three footsteps. Aira ritual is typically held under in the existing decoration gate with foodstuff crops, fruits and drinks. After the event, the foods are distributed to the relatives of those present. Since the Ambai overseas introduce the culture of reception stomp these dishes in the 1960s, has recently been used by groups in Papua, including local governments in welcoming guests.

== See also ==
- Ambai Islands topics
- Cenderawasih Bay
