= Vallecitos de Zaragoza =

Town in Guerrero, Mexico

Coordinates: 17°55′N 101°19′W

Vallecitos de Zaragoza is a town in Guerrero, Mexico.
