= 1979 Bali earthquake =

Earthquake in Indonesia

- Location within Bali
- UTC time: 1979-12-17 19:58:23
- ISC event: 654317
- USGS-ANSS: ComCat
- Local date: December 18, 1979
- Local time: 03:58
- Magnitude: 6.3 M_{s}
- Depth: 15 km (9 mi)
- Epicenter: 8.49°S 115.75°E
- Areas affected: Bali, Indonesia
- Max. intensity: MMI VIII (Severe)
- Landslides: Many
- Casualties: 27 killed 200 injured

The 1979 Bali earthquake occurred at 03:58 local time on 18 December with a surface-wave magnitude of 6.3. The shock occurred southeast of the coast of Karangasem Regency in the Lombok Strait, and about 60 kilometres (37 mi) east-northeast of Denpasar. Up to 80 percent of the buildings in Karangasem Regency were damaged, between 15,000 and 500,000 people were displaced, and road links to the provincial capital of Denpasar were briefly severed.

== Tectonic setting ==
The island of Bali forms part of the Sunda Arc, which formed above the convergent boundary where the Australian plate is subducting beneath the Sunda plate. The rate of convergence across the line of the Sunda–Java Trench is 7.5 cm per year. Eastwards from Bali, the Sunda Arc is also being thrust over the Bali and Flores back-arc basins on a series of south-dipping thrusts. Focal mechanisms for earthquakes near Bali are dominantly thrust sense on both the subduction interface and the system of thrust faults to the north.

A previous earthquake of 6.5 M_{s} north of the Buleleng coast on 14 July 1976 caused 573 deaths on Bali and displaced a similar number of people.

== Earthquake ==
A previous shock of 6.2 M_{s} on 20 October affected Mataram, the capital of the neighboring island Lombok, and damaged hundreds of buildings on that island as well as many on Bali. Two people were killed, including a 3-year-old boy in Lombok and a pregnant mother at a hospital in Denpasar. The epicenter of the 20 October temblor was approximately 28 km (17 mi) north-northeast of the 17 December temblor.

According to the United States Geological Survey (USGS), the 18 December shock occurred 60 km (37 mi) east-northeast of Denpasar at a depth of 15 km (9.3 mi). Initial reports by local observers suggested the epicenter may have been beneath the Mount Agung stratovolcano, however Indonesian authorities confirmed the location in the Lombok Strait. The shock was felt along the eastern coast of Lombok, although no significant damage was caused there.

As the temblor occurred during the early hours of the morning, there was significant panic; residents are reported to have fled to open fields and beaches for the rest of the night.

== Damage ==
Eighty percent of the homes and other buildings in Karangasem Regency were reported to have been destroyed or damaged. Approximately eighty thousand homes were destroyed, as well as 40 Hindu temples, 17 markets, 8 schools, several mosques and a public hospital. The villages of Culik, Datah and Tisla were reportedly left uninhabitable due to catastrophic damage.

== Relief efforts ==
The Indonesian Army established eleven temporary barracks in the affected region to assist those displaced. The Governor's office delivered at least 25 tonnes of rice to the displaced residents.

== See also ==
- List of earthquakes in 1979
- List of earthquakes in Indonesia
