= Mios Num =

Island in Papua, Indonesia

Coordinates: 1°30′S 135°13′E

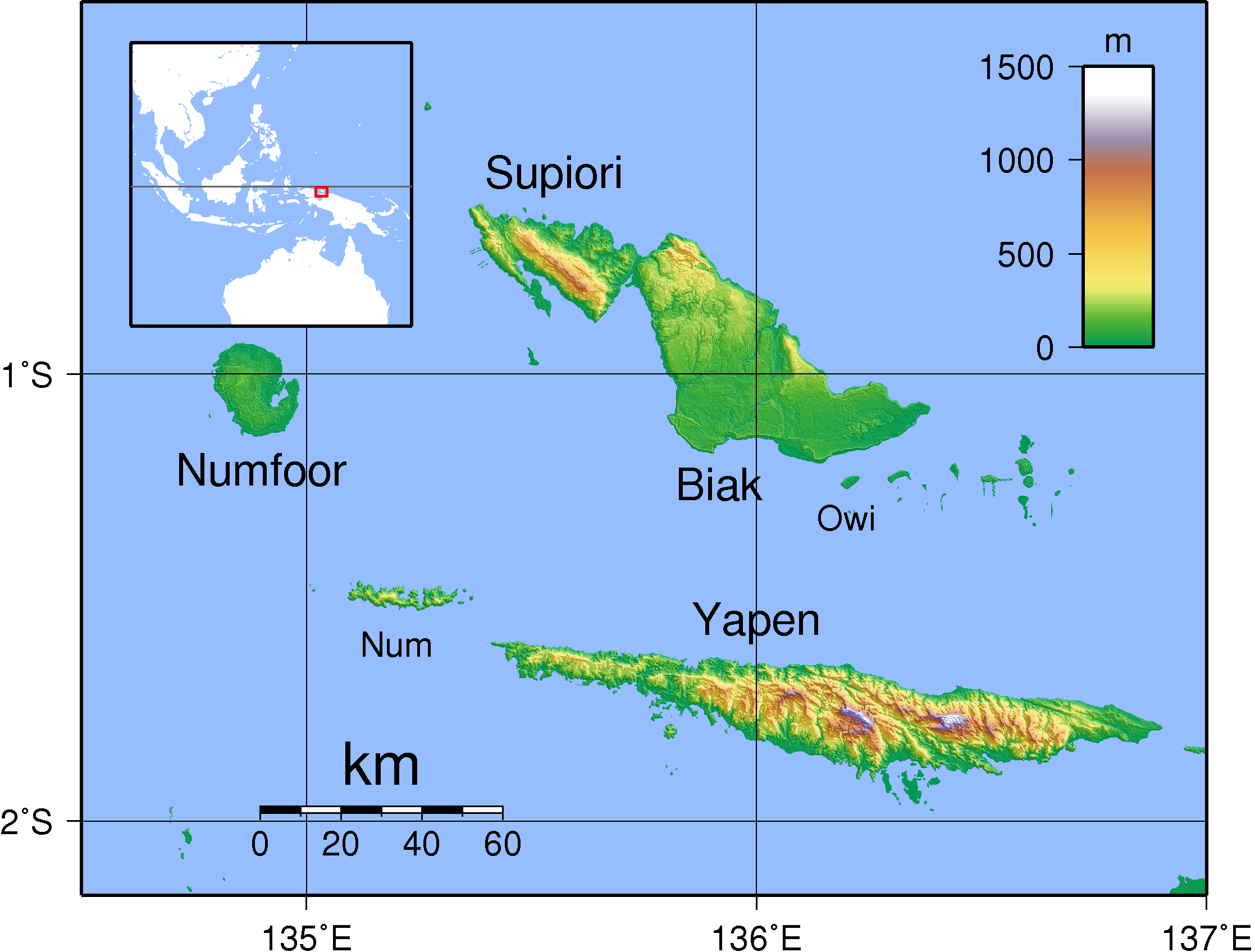
- Mios Num (Num) in Schouten Islands
- Interactive map of Mios Num

Geography
- Location: South East Asia
- Archipelago: Schouten Islands

Administration
- Indonesia

Mios Num (aka: Num, Indonesian language: Pulau Mios Num, or officially Pulau Yerui) is an island of the Yapen Islands group, in Papua Province of Western New Guinea, eastern Indonesia.

It is in Cenderawasih Bay. The Mios Num Strait separates it from the larger Yapen island to the east.

Numfoor and Biak are to the north, with the Aruri Strait in between.
