= Nabire Regency =

Regency in Central Papua, Indonesia

Nabire Regency Kabupaten Nabire
- Regency
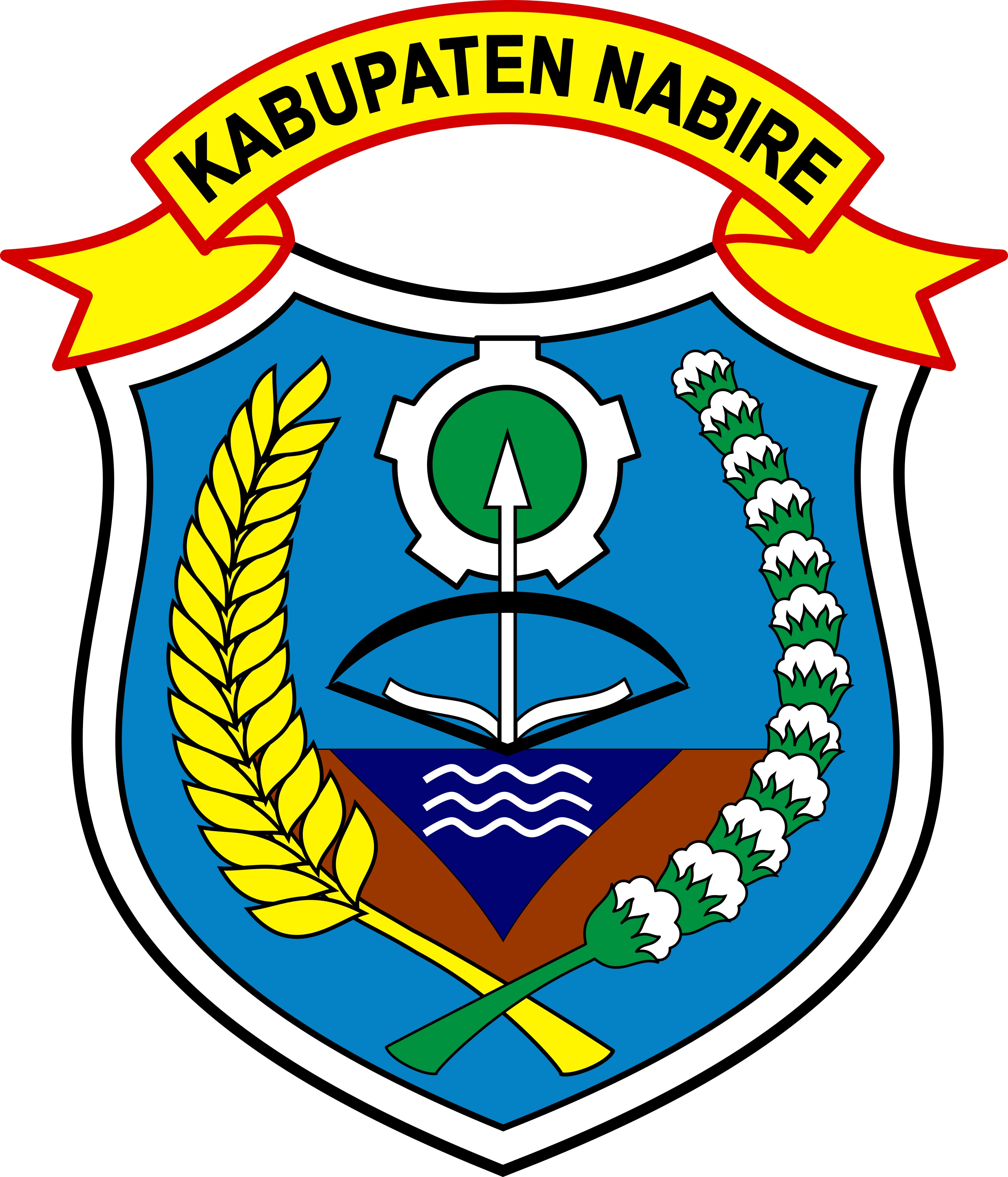
- Coat of arms

- Location in Western New Guinea and Indonesia Nabire Regency (Indonesia)
- Coordinates: 3.5402°S 135.5551°E
- Country: Indonesia
- Region: Papua
- Province: Central Papua
- Regency seat: Nabire

Government
  - Regent: Mesak Magai (PDI-P)
  - Vice Regent: Ismail Djamaluddin
  - Legislature: Nabire Regency House of Representatives

Area
  - Total: 12,075 km^{2} (4,662 sq mi)

Population (mid 2025 estimate)
  - Total: 180,190
  - Density: 14.923/km^{2} (38.649/sq mi)
- Time zone: UTC+9 (Indonesia Eastern Time)
- Area code: (+62) 984
- Website: nabirekab.go.id

Nabire Regency is one of the regencies (kabupaten) in the Indonesian province of Central Papua. It covers an area of 12,075.00 km^{2}, and had a population of 129,893 at the 2010 Census and 169,136 at the 2020 Census, comprising 87,688 males and 81,448 females. The official estimate as of mid-2025 was 180,190. The town of Nabire, which faces onto Cenderawasih Bay, is the administrative headquarters of the regency as well as the capital of the province.

== Administrative districts ==
In 2010 Nabire Regency comprised fourteen districts (distrik), but a fifteenth district - Moora Islands (Kepulauan Moora) - has been added since 2010 by the splitting of the islands away from Napan District. The districts are tabulated below with their areas and their populations at the 2010 Census and the 2020 Census, together with the official estimates as of mid-2025. The table also includes the location of the district administrative centres, the number of administrative villages in each district (totaling 72 rural kampung and 9 urban kelurahan - the latter all in Nabire (town) District), and its postal codes.

Kode Wilayah	Name of District (distrik)	Area in km^{2}	Pop'n 2010 Census	Pop'n 2020 Census	Pop'n mid 2025 Estimate	Admin centre	No. of villages	Post code(s)	List of desa (villages)
94.01.04	Uwapa	1,808.96	3,272	3,783	3,860	Topo	6	98842	Argo Mulyo, Gamei Jaya, Marga Jaya, Topo, Topo Jaya, Urumusu
94.01.15	Menou	1,416.41	2,896	1,349	936	Lokodimi	4	98855	Kunupi, Lokodimi, Ogiyai, Yegeugi
94.01.14	Dipa	838.63	3,893	1,501	941	Dikiya	5	98843	Dikiya, Epouwa, Jainoa, Jigikebo, Tagauto
94.01.03	Yaur	1,009.00	1,343	2,484	3,249	Kwatisore / Akudiomi	4	98852	Akudiomi, Sima, Wami, Yaur
94.01.08	Teluk Umar ^{(a)} (Umar Bay)	611.00	882	1,096	1,364	Yeretuar	4	98851	Bawei, Goni, Napan Yaur, Yeretuar
94.01.05	Wanggar	246.00	7,177	9,641	6,170	Karadiri I	3	98854	Bumi Mulia, Karadiri, Wanggar Makmur
94.01.12	Nabire Barat (West Nabire)	79.00	10,701	15,116	16,589	Kalisemen	5	98856	Bumi Raya, Gerbang Sadu, Kali Semen, Wadio, Waroki
94.01.01	Nabire (town)	127.00	74,197	98,851	103,859	Karang Mulia	12 ^{(b)}	98811 - 98822	Kali Harapan, Kalisusu, Sanoba (plus the 9 kelurahan)
94.01.09	Teluk Kimi (Kimi Bay)	178.00	8,987	16,929	18,831	Samabusa	5	98831 - 98835	Air Mandidi, Kimi, Lani, Samabusa, Waharia
94.01.02	Napan ^{(c)}	468.00	1,165	1,471	1,753	Napan	3	98862	Masipawa, Napan, Weinami
94.01.07	Makimi	1,421.00	5,362	7,014	8,184	Legari Jaya	6	98863	Biha, Lagari Jaya, Maidei, Makimi, Manunggal Jaya, Nifasi
94.01.11	Wapoga	1,040.00	981	953	1,117	Kamarisanoi	5	98861	Kamarisano, Keuw, Samanui, Taumi, Totoberi
94.01.13	Kepulauan Moora ^{(d)}	607.00	1,191	1,583	1,809	Arui	5	98864	Arui, Hariti, Kama, Mambor, Moor
94.01.06	Siriwo	1,400.00	4,653	2,673	2,342	Unipo	6	98841	Aibore, Epomani, Mabou, Tibai, Ugida, Unipo
94.01.10	Yaro	830.00	3,193	4,692	9,186	Jaya Mukti	8	98853	Bomopai, Jaya Mukti, Ororodo, Parauto, Wanggar Pantai, Wanggar Sari, Wiraska, Yaro Makmur
	Totals	12,075.00	129,893	169,136	180,190	Nabire	81		

Note: (a) includes Anggrameos Island in Cenderawasih Bay. (b) comprises 9 kelurahan (Girimulyo, Kali Bobo, Karang Mulia, Karang Tumaritis, Morgo, Nabarua, Oyehe, Siriwini and Wonorejo) and 3 desa.
(c) at the time of the 2010 Census, the Moora Islands were included in Napan District, but the figures have been separated in this table.
(d) The Moora Islands comprise the villages (desa) of Arui (25.18 km^{2}, with 201 inhabitants in 2020), Hariti (2.62 km^{2}, 288 inhabitants in 2020), Kama (5.71 km^{2}, 283 inhabitants in 2020), Mambor (3.51 km^{2}, 552 inhabitants in 2020) and Moor (4.67 km^{2}, 259 inhabitants in 2020).
