= Yapen Islands Regency =

Regency in Papua, Indonesia

Yapen Islands Regency Kabupaten Kepulauan Yapen
- Regency
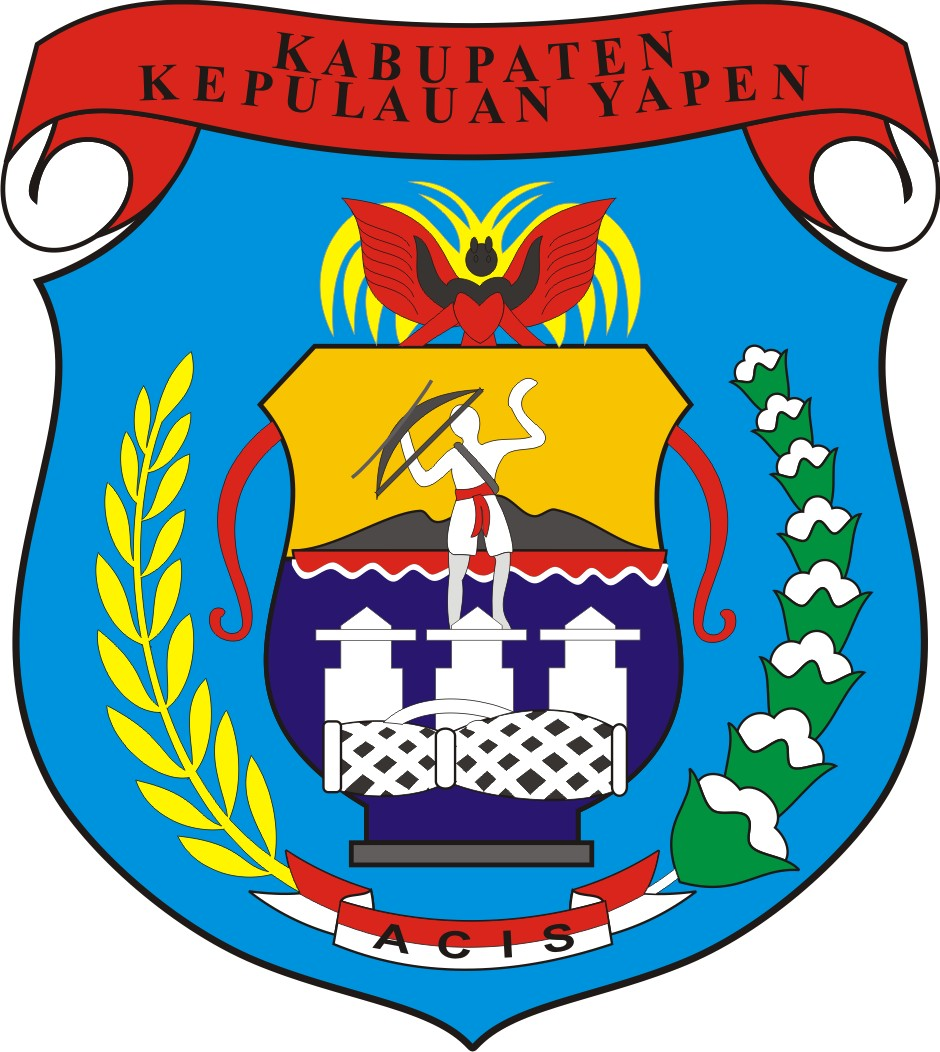
- Coat of arms
- Motto: Acis
- Location in Papua Province

- Location in Indonesian Papua Location in Indonesia
- Coordinates: 1.7877°S 136.2772°E
- Country: Indonesia
- Province: Papua
- Capital: Serui

Government
  - Regent: Benyamin Arisoy
  - Vice Regent: Roi Palunga

Area
  - Total: 2,429.03 km^{2} (937.85 sq mi)

Population (mid 2024 estimate)
  - Total: 116,214
  - Density: 47.8438/km^{2} (123.915/sq mi)
- Time zone: UTC+9 (Indonesia Eastern Time)
- Area code: (+62) 983
- Website: kepyapenkab.go.id

Yapen Islands Regency is a regency (kabupaten) in Papua Province of eastern Indonesia. It covers an area of 2,429.03 km^{2} (937.85 sq mi), and had a population of 82,951 at the 2010 Census and 112,676 at the 2020 Census; the official estimate as of mid-2024 was 116,214 (comprising 59,587 males and 56,627 females). It comprises an archipelago which lies in Cenderawasih Bay off the north coast of Western New Guinea.

== Geography ==
The regency includes the islands and island groups of the Yapen Islands archipelago, including the main Yapen Island as well as the adjacent Yerui (or Num) Island, Kurudu Island, Ambai Archipelago and Kuran Islands. Its capital is Serui town (part of Yapen Selatan district). The area is seismically active. A magnitude 7.5 earthquake in 1979 caused serious destruction and a tsunami, killing 115 people.

=== Administrative districts ===
The Yapen Islands Regency in 2010 comprised twelve districts (distrik); however, by 2018 four additional districts has been created (Anataurei, Pulau Kurudu, Pulau Yerui and Yawakukat), and another (Nusawani) was created in 2024 from the western part of Kepulauan Ambai District, bringing the total to seventeen, which are subdivided into 165 administrative "villages". The districts are tabulated below with their areas and their populations at the 2010 Census and 2020 Census, together with official estimates as of mid-2024.

Kurudu Island (Pulau Kurudu) lies to the east of Yapen, and Num Island (Pulau Yerui) lies to the west of Yapen, while the Ambai Archipelago (Kepulauan Ambai) and Kuran Islands lie immediately off the south coast of Yapen. Of the districts situated on Yapen Island itself, the western half of the island comprises Poom and Windesi Districts along the north coast and Wonawa, Yapen Barat and Kosiwo Districts along the south coast; the Kuran Islands lie off the coast of Yapen Barat District. The eastern half of the island comprises Pantura Yapen (formerly Yapen Utara) and Raimbawi Districts along the north coast, and Yapen Selatan (which includes the regional capital of Serui Town), Anataurei, Yawakukat, Angkaisera, Teluk Ampimoi and Yapen Timur Districts along the south coast; the Ambai Archipelago (comprising Kepulauan Ambai and Nusawani Districts) lie off the coast of Angkaisera District. The table also includes the name of the administrative centre of each district, the number of administrative villages in each district (160 rural kampung and 5 urban kelurahan in total) and its post code.

Kode Wilayah	Name of District (distrik)	Area in km^{2}	Pop'n 2010 Census	Pop'n 2020 Census	Pop'n mid 2024 Estimate	Admin centre	No. of villages	Post code
91.05.03	Yapen Timur (East Yapen)	108.89	4,618	6,969	7,191	Dawai	11	98644
91.05.07	Pantura Yapen (North Yapen)	426.45	2,304	2,920	3,420	Yobi	7	98645
91.05.09	Teluk Ampimoi (Ampimoi Bay)	132.33	3,416	3,224	4,286	Randawaya	11	98642
91.05.08	Raimbawi	23.80	2,455	1,481	1,776	Waindu	7	98641
95.05.13	Pulau Kurudu (Kurudu Island)	20.18	^{(a)}	1,585	1,687	Kirimbri	8	98643
91.05.04	Angkaisera	126.65	8,046	7,240	7,574	Menawi	11	98655
91.05.10	Kepulauan Ambai (Ambai Islands)	25.19	3,656	4,200	3,406	Ambai	13	98653
91.05.17	Nusawani	7.32	^{(b)}	^{(b)}	1,600	Perea	5	98653
95.05.16	Yawakukat	40.53	^{(c)}	3,436	3,884	Waniwon	7	98654
91.05.01	Yapen Selatan (South Yapen)	26.39	38,032	39,814	36,286	Serui Kota	13 ^{(d)}	98612: 98627
91.05.06	Kosiwo	300.13	3,781	5,391	6,465	Tatui	15	98632
91.05.15	Anataurei	23.80	^{(e)}	17,683	15,758	Anataurei	8 ^{(f)}	98631
91.05.02	Yapen Barat (West Yapen)	213.31	7,831	9,242	10,357	Ansus	17 ^{(f)}	98648
91.05.11	Wonawa	95.16	3,153	2,916	3,617	Wooi	10	98647
91.05.14	Pulau Yerui (Yerui or Num Island)	78.72	^{(g)}	827	1,013	Miosnum	5	98646
91.05.05	Poom	142.43	3,128	3,255	4,166	Poom	8	98652
91.05.12	Windesi	178.076	2,531	2,493	3,728	Windesi	9	98651
	Totals	2,429.03	82,951	112,676	116,214		165	

Notes: Kepulauan Ambai District consists of 35 islands (including Nusawani District); Yapen Barat District includes 20 small offshore islands, while Poom District includes five small offshore islands and Wonawa District includes 37 small offshore islands.
(a) the 2010 figure for Pulau Kurudu District is included in that for Yapen Timur District, from which it was split.
(b) effectively Saweru Island (Pulau Saweru) and some smaller islands to the south; the 2010 and 2020 figures for Nusawani District are included in those for Kepulauan Ambai District, from which it was split.
(c) the 2010 figure for Yawakukat District is included in that for Angkaisera District, from which it was split.
(d) including three kelurahan - Serui Jaya, Serui Kota and Tarau.
(e) the 2010 figure for Anataurei District is included in that for Yapen Selatan District, from which it was split.
(f) including one kelurahan (the district centre as referenced).
(g) the 2010 figure for Pulau Yerui District is included in that for Yapen Barat District, from which it was split.

== Climate ==
Serui has a tropical rainforest climate (Af) with heavy rainfall year-round.

Climate data for Serui
Month	Jan	Feb	Mar	Apr	May	Jun	Jul	Aug	Sep	Oct	Nov	Dec	Year
Mean daily maximum °C (°F)	30.4 (86.7)	30.3 (86.5)	30.3 (86.5)	30.5 (86.9)	30.4 (86.7)	29.8 (85.6)	29.2 (84.6)	29.4 (84.9)	29.9 (85.8)	30.3 (86.5)	30.5 (86.9)	30.5 (86.9)	30.1 (86.2)
Daily mean °C (°F)	26.4 (79.5)	26.4 (79.5)	26.4 (79.5)	26.6 (79.9)	26.6 (79.9)	26.1 (79.0)	25.6 (78.1)	25.7 (78.3)	26.0 (78.8)	26.3 (79.3)	26.5 (79.7)	26.5 (79.7)	26.3 (79.3)
Mean daily minimum °C (°F)	22.5 (72.5)	22.5 (72.5)	22.6 (72.7)	22.7 (72.9)	22.8 (73.0)	22.5 (72.5)	22.1 (71.8)	22.1 (71.8)	22.2 (72.0)	22.4 (72.3)	22.6 (72.7)	22.6 (72.7)	22.5 (72.5)
Average rainfall mm (inches)	267 (10.5)	277 (10.9)	317 (12.5)	217 (8.5)	251 (9.9)	248 (9.8)	246 (9.7)	279 (11.0)	234 (9.2)	236 (9.3)	224 (8.8)	286 (11.3)	3,082 (121.4)
Source: Climate-Data.org

== See also ==
- Yapen Islands topics
