= Nabire =

Capital district of Central Papua, Indonesia

- Town (District)
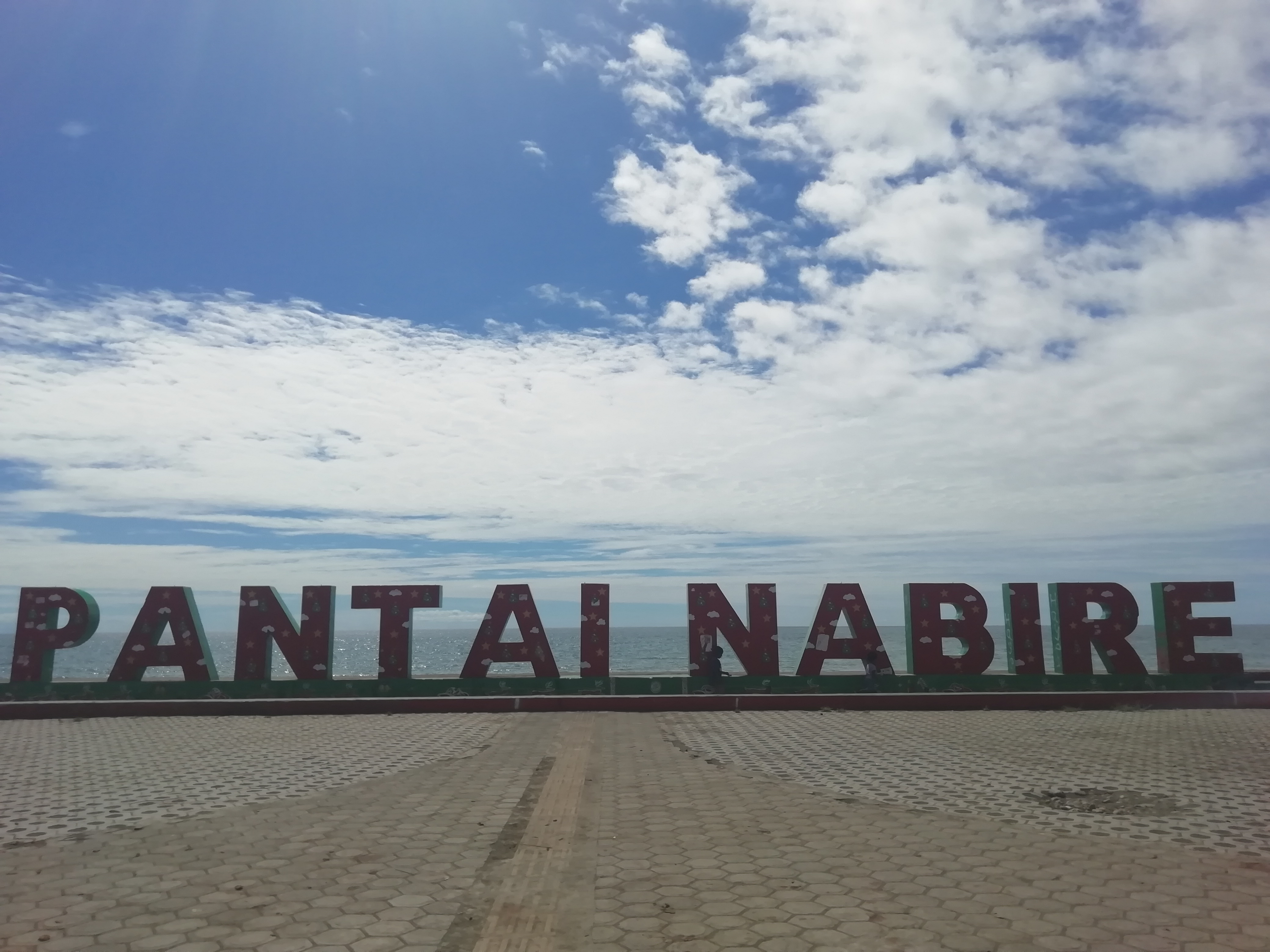
- Nabire Beach signage
- Interactive map of Nabire
- Location in Central Papua Location in Indonesian Papua Location in Indonesia
- Coordinates: 3°21′44″S 135°30′10″E
- Country: Indonesia
- Province: Central Papua
- Regency: Nabire Regency

Area
  - Total: 109.01 km^{2} (42.09 sq mi)
- Elevation: 6 m (20 ft)

Population (mid 2021 estimate)
  - Total: 99,848
  - Density: 915.95/km^{2} (2,372.3/sq mi)
- Time zone: UTC+9 (Indonesia Eastern Time)
- Area code: (+62) 984

Nabire, also known as the District of Nabire, is the capital of the Indonesian province of Central Papua, located at the western end of New Guinea. The town is the administrative seat of the Nabire Regency. It is served by Douw Aturure Airport.

== Geography ==
The town lies on the northern coast of the island on Cenderawasih Bay.

=== Climate ===
Nabire has a tropical rainforest climate (Köppen Af) with heavy to very heavy rainfall year-round.

Climate data for Nabire (2007–2020)
Month	Jan	Feb	Mar	Apr	May	Jun	Jul	Aug	Sep	Oct	Nov	Dec	Year
Mean daily maximum °C (°F)	32.1 (89.8)	32.0 (89.6)	32.1 (89.8)	32.1 (89.8)	31.8 (89.2)	31.3 (88.3)	31.3 (88.3)	31.4 (88.5)	31.7 (89.1)	32.1 (89.8)	32.1 (89.8)	32.3 (90.1)	31.9 (89.3)
Mean daily minimum °C (°F)	23.8 (74.8)	23.7 (74.7)	23.9 (75.0)	24.3 (75.7)	24.4 (75.9)	24.1 (75.4)	23.6 (74.5)	23.5 (74.3)	23.8 (74.8)	24.1 (75.4)	24.4 (75.9)	24.1 (75.4)	24.0 (75.1)
Average rainfall mm (inches)	369.0 (14.53)	513.6 (20.22)	522.5 (20.57)	414.8 (16.33)	353.4 (13.91)	399.3 (15.72)	383.0 (15.08)	348.6 (13.72)	401.9 (15.82)	339.8 (13.38)	359.5 (14.15)	409.5 (16.12)	4,814.9 (189.55)
Average rainy days	16.7	17.3	18.9	17.2	17.6	17.1	18.6	18.6	17.6	16.6	15.6	17.4	209.2
Source: Meteomanz

== Attractions ==
Nabire is a tourist resort, with numerous attractions, including:

- the sea garden of Cenderawasih bay with 130 species of coral,
- Wahario Beach also known as Gedo Beach Youth Tourism Park, is located in Sanoba Village.
- Pepaya island with ideal conditions for diving,
- hot springs with water temperature up to 80 °C or 176 °F.

== Notable inhabitants ==
- Marthen Douw
- Patrich Wanggai

== See also ==
- Nabire Airport
