= Yapen =

Island in the region of Papua, Indonesia

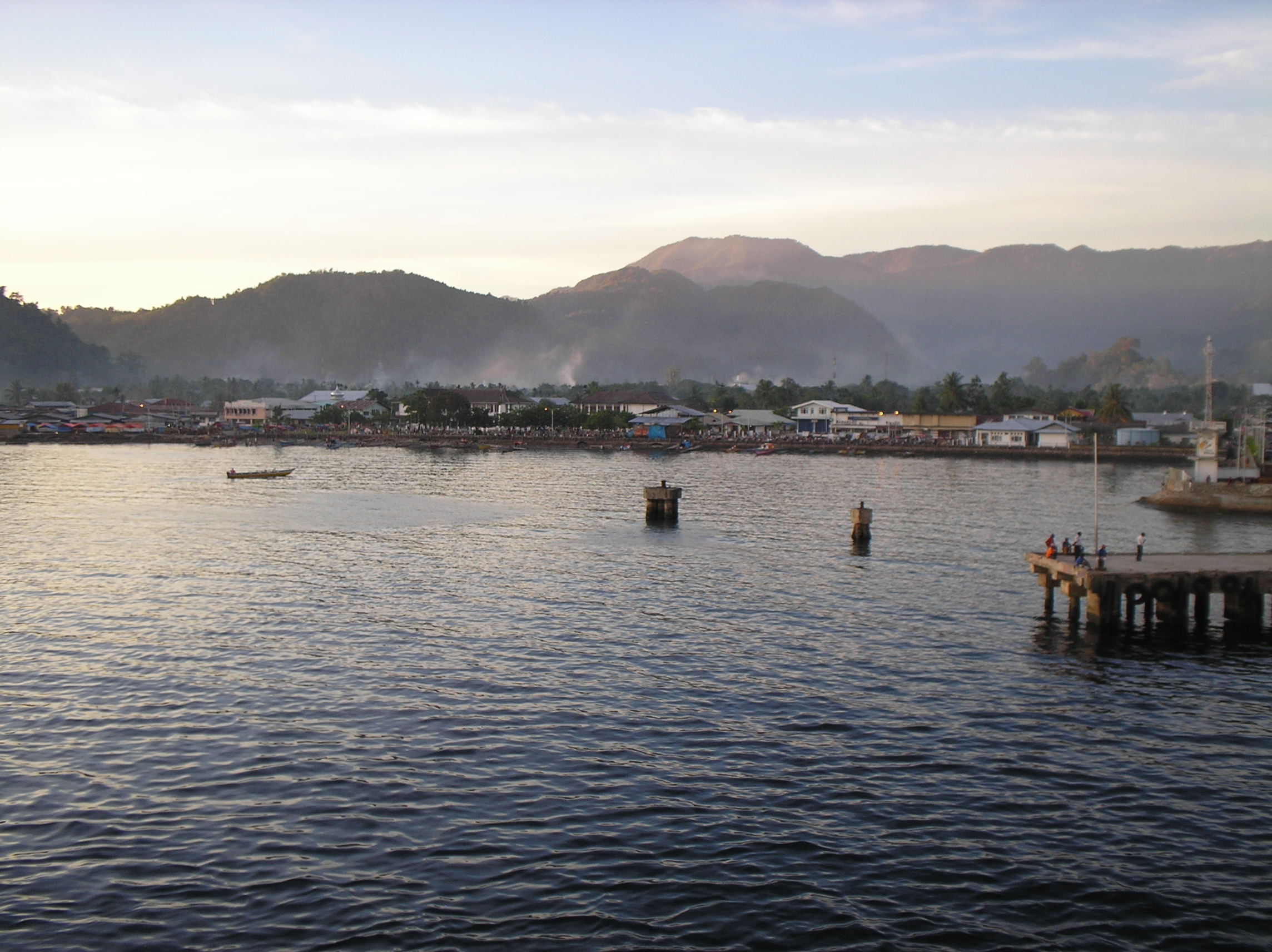
- Yapen with Serui seen in the background.

- Location of Yapen Islands

- Location in Papua Province Location in Indonesian Papua Location in Indonesia

Geography
- Location: Melanesia; Oceania
- Coordinates: 1°45′S 136°08′E
- Area: 2,278 km^{2} (880 sq mi)
- Highest elevation: 1,496 m (4908 ft)

Administration
- Indonesia
- Province: Papua
- Regency: Yapen Islands

Additional information
- Time zone: Indonesia Eastern Standard Time (UTC+09:00)

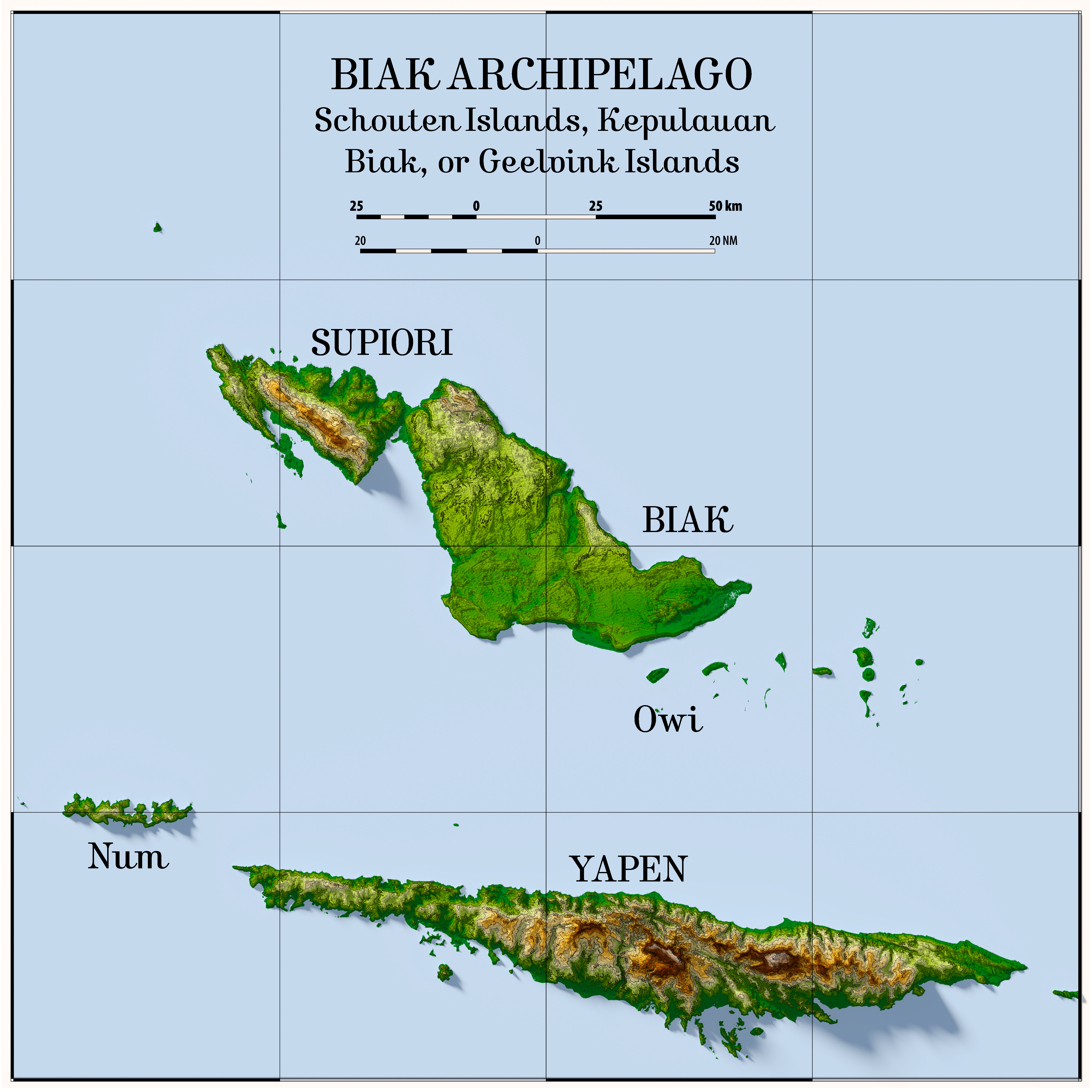
Yapen and the Schouten Islands

Yapen (also Japen, Jobi) is an island of Papua, Indonesia. The Yapen Strait separates Yapen and the Biak Islands to the north. It is in Cenderawasih Bay off the north-western coast of the island of New Guinea. To the west is Mios Num Island across the Mios Num Strait, and to the east Kurudu Island. Off the southeast coast of Yapen are the Amboi Islands and to the southwest are the Kuran Islands. Together these islands form the Yapen Islands Regency within the province of Papua. It is populated with communities of Yobi, Randowaya, Serui, and Ansus. Its highest point is 1,496 metres (4,908 feet).

First recorded sighting by Europeans is by Spanish navigator Álvaro de Saavedra who landed on 24 June 1528 when trying to return from Tidore to New Spain. It was then charted as Paine within the Islas de Oro (Golden Islands in Spanish), as they called Yapen and the present day Schoutens. In 1545, it was visited by Íñigo Ortiz de Retes on board of galleon San Juan.

The earthquake of 1979 caused serious damage and killed at least 115 people on the island.

== Ecology ==
The island has been designated the Yapen rain forests ecoregion by the World Wildlife Federation for its unique bird life and flora. Two protected areas cover a third of the island, whose population is growing with the subsequent clearance of forest for planting and firewood.

== See also ==
- Yapen languages (Austronesian)
- Yapen languages (Papuan)
