= Cenderawasih Bay =

Bay in the northern Province of Papua and West Papua, New Guinea, Indonesia

- Teluk Cenderawasih (Indonesian)
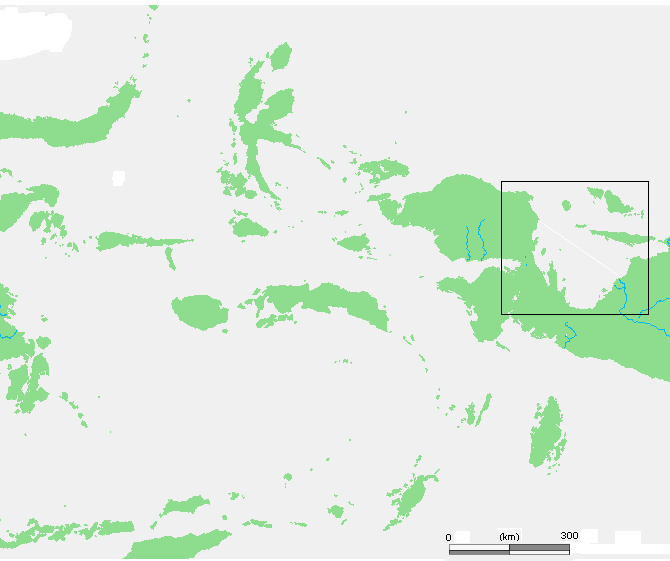
- Location of Cenderawasih Bay

- Location within Western New Guinea
- Location: Western New Guinea
- Coordinates: 2°30′00″S 135°20′00″E
- Type: Bay
- Basin countries: Indonesia
- Max. width: 450 kilometres (280 mi)
- Max. depth: 1,627 metres (5,338 ft)

Cenderawasih Bay (Indonesian: Teluk Cenderawasih, "Bird of Paradise Bay"), also known as Sarera Bay (Indonesian: Teluk Sarera) and formerly Geelvink Bay (Dutch: Geelvinkbaai), is a large bay in northern Province of Papua, Central Papua and West Papua, New Guinea, Indonesia.

== Geography ==
Cenderawasih Bay is a large bay to the northwest of the Indonesian province of Papua, north of the province of Central Papua, and east of the province of West Papua, between the Bird's Head Peninsula and the mouth of the Mamberamo River.

The bay is more than 300 kilometers wide. The coastline from Manokwari, in the northwest of the bay, to Cape d'Urville at the mouth of the Mamberamo is more than 700 kilometers long. To the south, the Wandammen Peninsula heads north into the bay. Important places along the coast are Manokwari, Ransiki, Wasior, and Nabire.

The Wamma River, Tabai River, Warenai River, and Wapoga River empty into the Bay.

== History ==
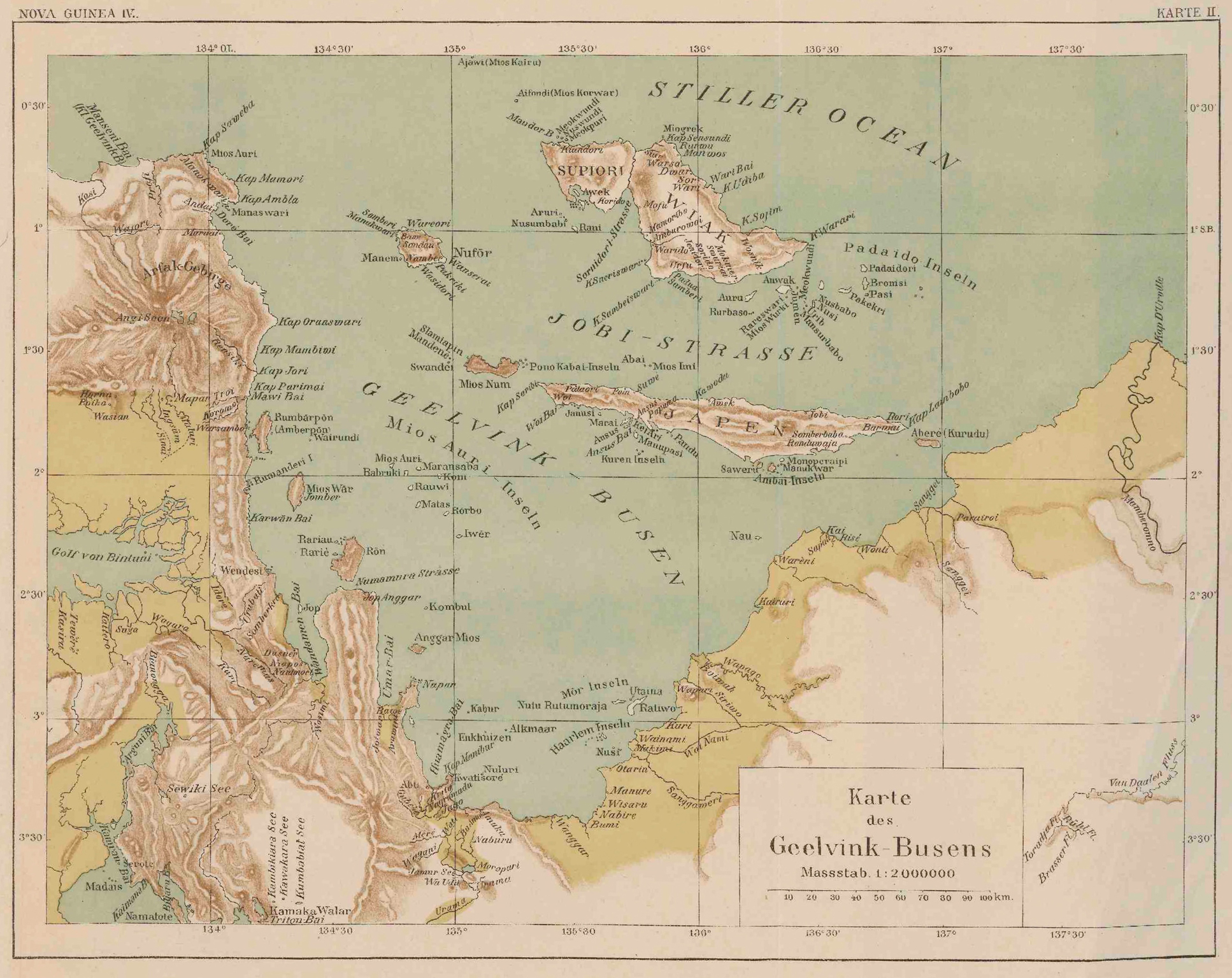
German Map of Cenderawasih Bay from the North New Guinea Expedition (1903)

The Dutch name of the bay was after the frigate De Geelvink with which Jacob Weyland sailed through the bay in 1705. The Dutch frigate was named after the Geelvinck family.

The Tidore Sultanate had tributary ties with the region. Seafarers from the area used to pay homage to the sultan regularly.

== Marine National park ==
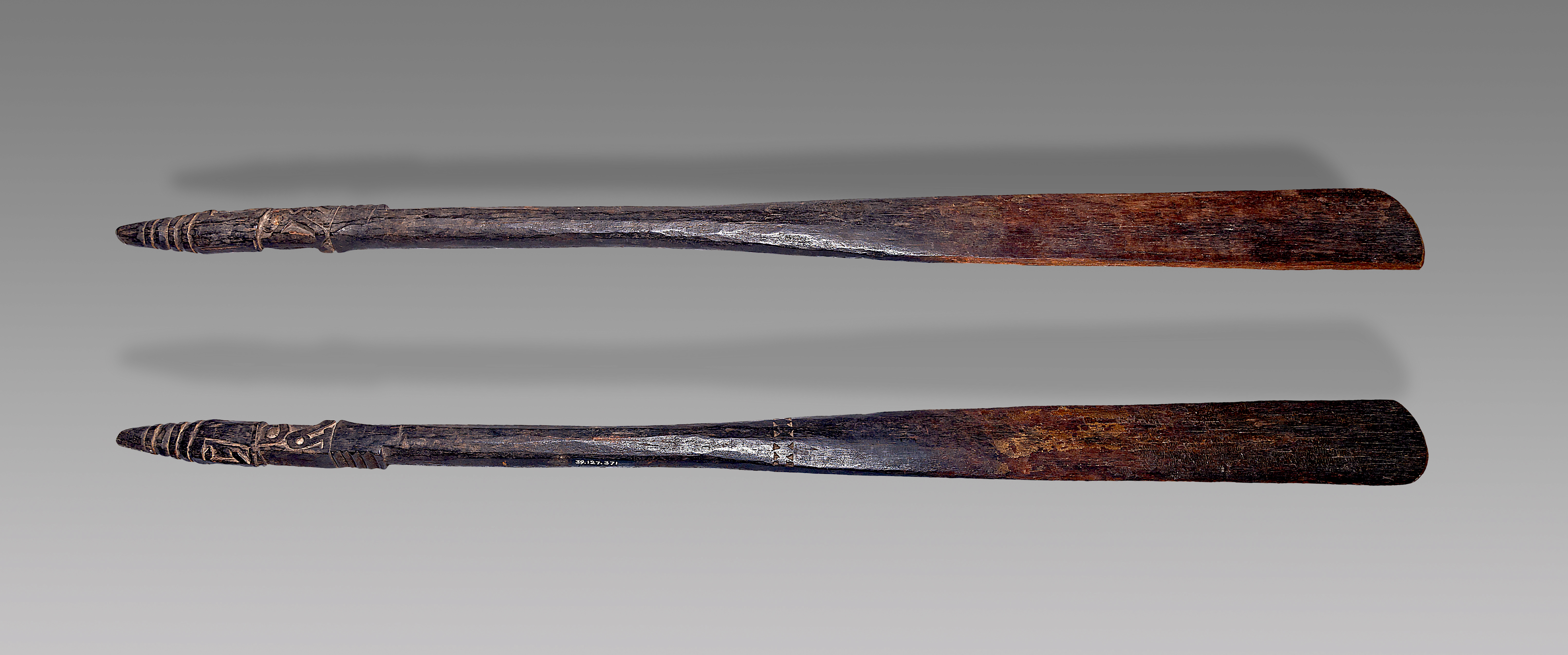
Wooden spatula from Cenderawasih Bay (previously Geelvink Bay).

Teluk Cenderawasih National Park is located in the Teluk Cenderawasih. In the Cenderawasih Bay, extensive coral reefs exist. Parts of the area have been declared a protected marine reserve of 1.5 million hectares, the largest natural park in Southeast Asia. The western part of the bay was declared a marine national park in 2002. The Wondiwoi/Wandammen Natural Reserve of 730 km2 protects the great biodiversity of the Wandammen Peninsula.

== Islands ==
In the bay is the archipelago known as the Biak Islands (also called the Schouten Islands, or Geelvink Islands), comprising Biak, the Padaido Islands, Supiori, and Numfor (Numfoor). Further south in the bay is the 140-kilometer-long island of Yapen (Japen). Smaller islands in the bay are Mios Num (Pulau Num), Rumberpon, Waar (or Meoswaar), Roon, and Kurudu. The Mapia Islands lie to the north and south of Palau.

=== West Papua Province ===
- Auri Islands archipelago (Kepulauan Auri)
- Meos Waar
- Rumberpon
- Roon Island
- Meos Angra

=== Papua Province ===
- Biak Islands (aka Schouten Islands):
  - Biak
  - Padaido Islands (Kepulauan Padaido)
  - Numfor
  - Supiori
- Yapen Islands
  - Yapen
  - Mios Num
  - Kurudu
  - Ambai Islands (Kepulauan Ambai)
  - Kuran Islands (Kepulauan Kuran)

=== Central Papua Province ===
- Moora Islands archipelago (Kepulauan Moora)
- Anggrameos Island

== See also ==
- Bays of Indonesia
- Cenderawasih languages
