= Vallecito =

Vallecito may refer to:

== Places ==
In the United States

- Vallecito, California, in Calaveras County
- Vallecito, San Diego County, California
- Vallecito Mountains, San Diego County, California
- Vallecito, Colorado
- Vallecito Dam, Colorado
- Vallecito Mountain, in New Mexico

Elsewhere

- Vallecito, San Juan, Argentina
- El Vallecito, an archaeological site in La Rumorosa, Baja California, Mexico

== See also ==
- Vallecito Creek (disambiguation)
- Vallecitos (disambiguation)
