= Lake San Marcos, California =

Lake San Marcos
- unincorporated community census-designated place
- Location in San Diego County and the state of California

- Location in the United States
- Coordinates: 33°7′21″N 117°12′34″W
- Country: United States
- State: California
- County: San Diego

Area
  - Total: 1.810 sq mi (4.687 km^{2})
  - Land: 1.707 sq mi (4.421 km^{2})
  - Water: 0.103 sq mi (0.266 km^{2}) 5.68%
- Elevation: 520 ft (160 m)

Population (2020)
  - Total: 5,328
  - Density: 3,121/sq mi (1,205/km^{2})
- Time zone: UTC-8 (PST)
  - Summer (DST): UTC-7 (PDT)
- ZIP code: 92078
- Area codes: 442/760
- FIPS code: 06-39724
- GNIS feature ID: 1660879

Lake San Marcos is an unincorporated community in the North County region of the San Diego metropolitan area. For statistical purposes, the United States Census Bureau has defined the community as a census-designated place (CDP). Surrounded by the city of San Marcos, the county-governed area receives certain services from the city. As of the 2020 census, Lake San Marcos had a population of 5,328.

== History ==
There is considerable evidence of human inhabitation of the area long before the Spanish establishment of the Mission San Diego de Alcala in A.D. 1769. Native American tribes lived and flourished near the San Luis Rey River in the Late Prehistoric period. Much of this area was originally part of Rancho Vallecitos de San Marcos. On April 22, 1840, Governor Juan Bautista Alvarado granted the 8,877-acre Rancho Los Vallecitos de San Marcos to Don Jose Maria Alvarado who married Lugarda Osuna, daughter of the owner of San Dieguito Rancho, Don Juan Maria Osuna.

== Geography ==
Lake San Marcos is an unincorporated area of San Diego County, surrounded by the City of San Marcos. It is a resort-based community surrounding the Lake San Marcos reservoir.

According to the United States Census Bureau, the CDP has a total area of 1.8 square miles (4.7 km^{2}). 1.7 square miles (4.4 km^{2}) of it is land and 0.1 square miles (0.26 km^{2}) of it (5.68%) is water. The lake after which the area is named is a large artificial body of water originally created for purposes of irrigation and watering cattle; today, however, it is used primarily for recreational and commercial purposes. The lake was created by a concrete dam built between 1946 and 1951.

== Demographics ==
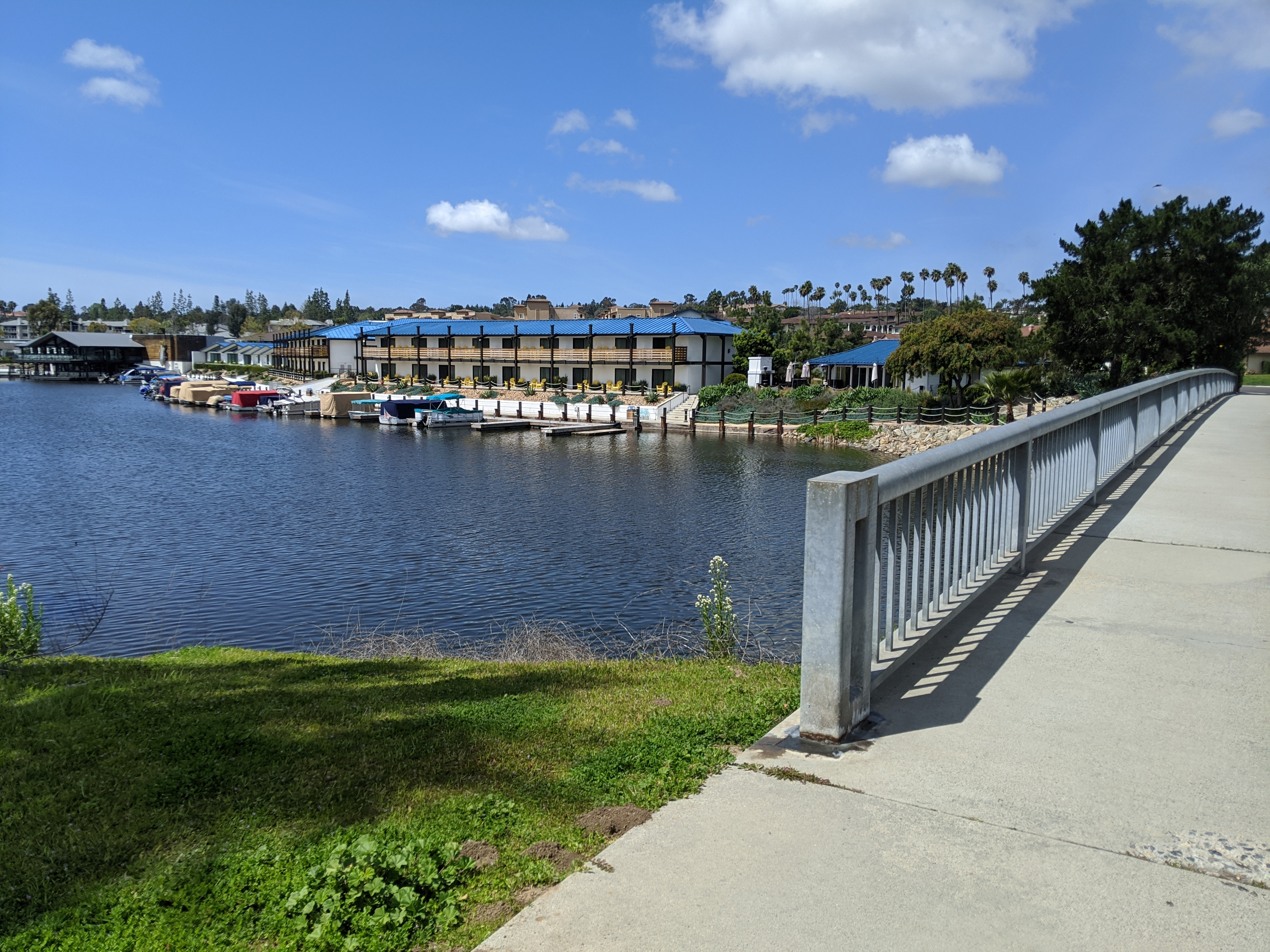
Lakehouse Hotel, as seen from the Lake San Marcos Bridge

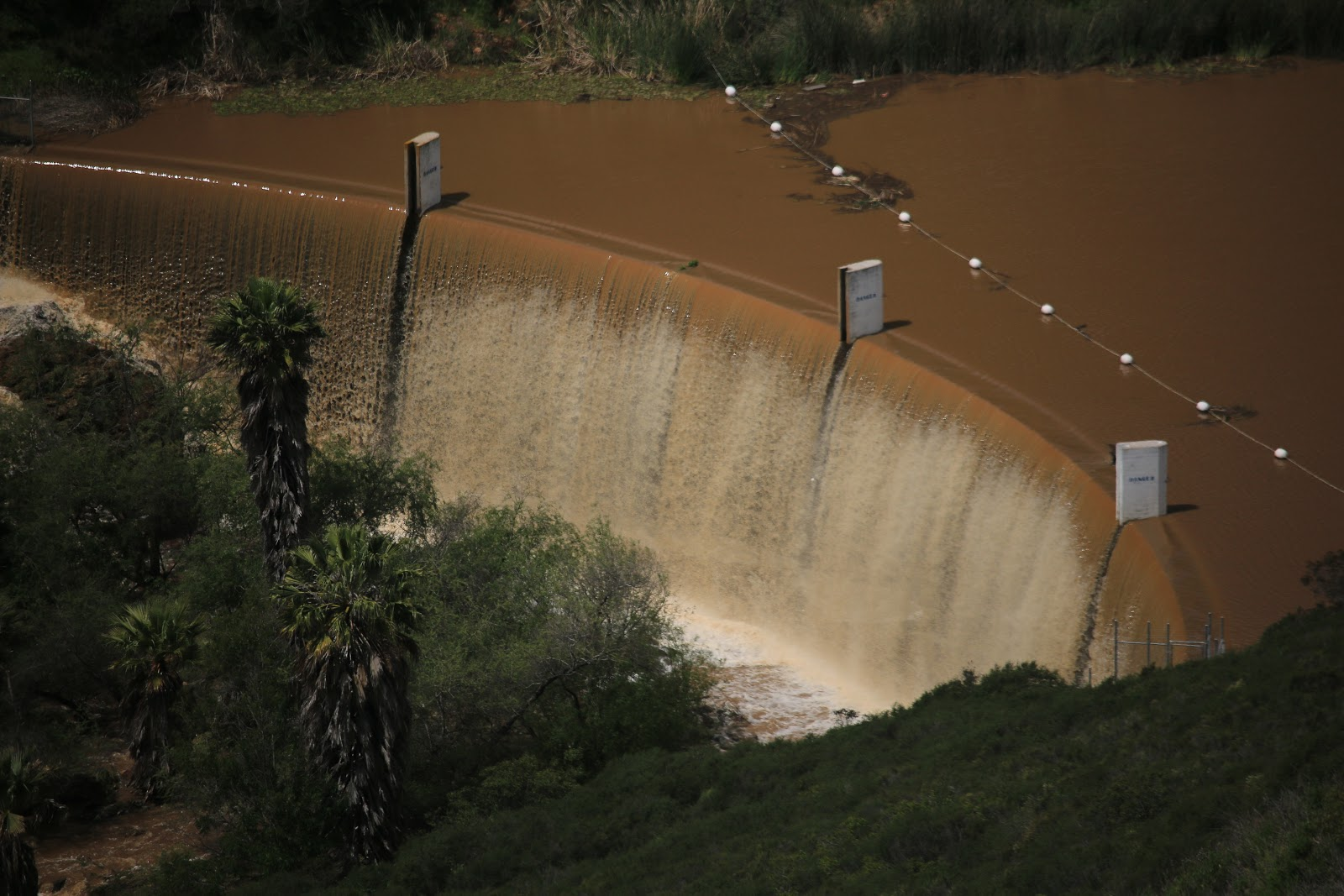
Lake San Marcos Dam overflowing in April 2020

Historical population
Census	Pop.	Note	%±
1990	3,802		—
2000	4,138		8.8%
2010	4,437		7.2%
2020	5,328		20.1%
U.S. Decennial Census; 1860–1870 1880-1890; 1900 1910 1920; 1930 1940 1950; 1960 1970 1980; 1990 2000 2010; 2020

Lake San Marcos was first listed as a census designated place in the 1990 U.S. census.

=== Racial and ethnic composition ===
Lake San Marcos CDP, California – Racial and ethnic composition Note: the US Census treats Hispanic/Latino as an ethnic category. This table excludes Latinos from the racial categories and assigns them to a separate category. Hispanics/Latinos may be of any race.
Race / Ethnicity (NH = Non-Hispanic)	Pop 2000	Pop 2010	Pop 2020	% 2000	% 2010	% 2020
White alone (NH)	3,761	3,712	4,068	90.89%	83.66%	76.35%
Black or African American alone (NH)	11	35	29	0.27%	0.79%	0.54%
Native American or Alaska Native alone (NH)	5	14	7	0.12%	0.32%	0.13%
Asian alone (NH)	71	132	296	1.72%	2.97%	5.56%
Native Hawaiian or Pacific Islander alone (NH)	5	3	2	0.12%	0.07%	0.04%
Other race alone (NH)	2	9	22	0.05%	0.20%	0.41%
Mixed race or Multiracial (NH)	46	68	218	1.11%	1.53%	4.09%
Hispanic or Latino (any race)	237	464	686	5.73%	10.46%	12.88%
Total	4,138	4,437	5,328	100.00%	100.00%	100.00%

=== 2020 census ===
As of the 2020 census, Lake San Marcos had a population of 5,328, up from 4,437 in 2010. The population density was 3,121.3 inhabitants per square mile (1,205.1/km^{2}). 100.0% of residents lived in urban areas, while 0.0% lived in rural areas.

The racial makeup of Lake San Marcos was 78.8% White, 0.6% African American, 0.2% Native American, 5.7% Asian, 0.1% Pacific Islander, 5.1% from other races, and 9.5% from two or more races. Hispanic or Latino of any race were 12.9% of the population.

The census reported that 94.6% of the population lived in households and 5.4% were institutionalized. There were 2,474 households, out of which 14.9% included children under the age of 18, 48.9% were married-couple households, 5.4% were cohabiting couple households, 32.7% had a female householder with no spouse or partner present, and 13.0% had a male householder with no spouse or partner present. 32.7% of households were one person, and 25.0% were one person aged 65 or older. The average household size was 2.04. There were 1,512 families (61.1% of all households).

The age distribution was 10.8% under the age of 18, 3.8% aged 18 to 24, 12.8% aged 25 to 44, 25.7% aged 45 to 64, and 46.9% who were 65 years of age or older. The median age was 63.3 years. For every 100 females, there were 79.5 males, and for every 100 females age 18 and over there were 76.3 males age 18 and over.

There were 2,615 housing units at an average density of 1,531.9 units per square mile (591.5 units/km^{2}), of which 2,474 (94.6%) were occupied. Of these, 76.8% were owner-occupied, and 23.2% were occupied by renters. 5.4% of housing units were vacant. The homeowner vacancy rate was 1.6%, and the rental vacancy rate was 3.4%.

=== Income and poverty ===
In 2023, the US Census Bureau estimated that the median household income was $100,676, and the per capita income was $57,383. About 2.5% of families and 6.3% of the population were below the poverty line.

=== 2010 census ===
At the 2010 census Lake San Marcos had a population of 4,437. The population density was 2,455.8 inhabitants per square mile (948.2/km^{2}). The racial makeup of Lake San Marcos was 3,978 (89.7%) White, 37 (0.8%) African American, 20 (0.5%) Native American, 133 (3.0%) Asian, 3 (0.1%) Pacific Islander, 186 (4.2%) from other races, and 80 (1.8%) from two or more races. Hispanic or Latino of any race were 464 people (10.5%).

The census reported that 4,435 people (100% of the population) lived in households, no one lived in non-institutionalized group quarters and 2 (0%) were institutionalized.

There were 2,328 households, 221 (9.5%) had children under the age of 18 living in them, 1,112 (47.8%) were opposite-sex married couples living together, 131 (5.6%) had a female householder with no husband present, 56 (2.4%) had a male householder with no wife present. There were 81 (3.5%) unmarried opposite-sex partnerships, and 16 (0.7%) same-sex married couples or partnerships. 877 households (37.7%) were one person and 659 (28.3%) had someone living alone who was 65 or older. The average household size was 1.91. There were 1,299 families (55.8% of households); the average family size was 2.45.

The age distribution was 366 people (8.2%) under the age of 18, 184 people (4.1%) aged 18 to 24, 597 people (13.5%) aged 25 to 44, 1,212 people (27.3%) aged 45 to 64, and 2,078 people (46.8%) who were 65 or older. The median age was 63.3 years. For every 100 females, there were 79.3 males. For every 100 females age 18 and over, there were 76.7 males.

There were 2,533 housing units at an average density of 1,402.0 per square mile, of the occupied units 1,835 (78.8%) were owner-occupied and 493 (21.2%) were rented. The homeowner vacancy rate was 2.3%; the rental vacancy rate was 5.3%. 3,417 people (77.0% of the population) lived in owner-occupied housing units and 1,018 people (22.9%) lived in rental housing units.

== Government ==
While Lake San Marcos is an independent and unincorporated community, it is also greatly dependent upon the city of San Marcos for many public services, including public schools, the fire department, the Vallecitos Water District, and the San Marcos sheriff station. Lake San Marcos is governed by the Lake San Marcos Community Association, a nonprofit organization.

In the California State Legislature, Lake San Marcos is in the 40th senatorial district, represented by Republican Brian Jones, and in the 76th Assembly district, represented by Democrat Darshana Patel.

In the United States House of Representatives, Lake San Marcos is in California's 50th congressional district, represented by Democrat Scott Peters.

== Education ==
It is in San Marcos Unified School District.
