= Mission Hills High School =

School in San Marcos, California

Coordinates: 33°8′42″N 117°8′32″W

Location
- 1 Mission Hills Ct. San Marcos, California 92069

Information
- Type: Public
- Established: 2004
- School district: San Marcos Unified School District
- Principal: Gary Pope
- Teaching staff: 111.14 (FTE)
- Enrollment: 2,751 (2024-2025)
- Student to teacher ratio: 24.75
- Campus: Suburban
- Colors: Cardinal Red and Vegas Gold
- Mascot: Grizzly
- Website: https://missionhillshigh.smusd.org/

Mission Hills High School is a high school located in San Marcos, California. It first opened in August 2004 on 40 acres (160,000 m^{2}) of land that was previously part of the local Hollandia Dairy. It has many career-oriented programs, such as the Academies of Business, Law Enforcement, Health Essentials, Fire Technology, and Culinary Arts.

== PACE Promise ==
The PACE Promise, a joint program of San Marcos Unified School District (SMUSD) and California State University San Marcos (CSUSM), guarantees CSUSM admission to all district students continuously enrolled in the district from 9th through 12th grade who meet entrance requirements. This program began with the SMUSD graduating class of 2009.

The Promise provides preparation for college. Beginning in seventh grade, San Marcos students work to fulfill program expectations.

== Jack Ashby Field ==
Mission Hills High School is home to one of several fields that have names in San Diego County. The field was named in honor of long-time San Marcos coach, Jack Ashby. He served as the school's first athletic director before retiring in 2005.

== Demographics ==
- Hispanic: 49.3% (+1.2%)
- White: 36.7% (-1.2%)
- Filipino: 3.5% (-0.6%)
- Asian: 4.6% (+0.2%)
- African-American 3.6% (-0.2%)

== Notable alumni ==
Name	Grad Class	Category	Best Known For
Marcus Hatley		Sports	Former professional baseball pitcher
Chris Olave		Sports	Wide receiver for the New Orleans Saints
Jack Tuttle		Sports	College football quarterback for the Michigan Wolverines
Fred Warner		Sports	Professional football linebacker for the San Francisco 49ers

== See also ==
- San Marcos High School
- Escondido High School
- California wildfires of October 2007
