= Allan Clark =

American football player (born 1957)

No. 35, 34, 42
- Position: Running back

Personal information
- Born: June 8, 1957 (age 69); Grand Rapids, Minnesota, U.S.
- Listed height: 5 ft 10 in (1.78 m)
- Listed weight: 186 lb (84 kg)

Career information
- High school: San Marcos (San Marcos, California)
- College: Northern Arizona
- NFL draft: 1979: 10th round, 271st overall pick

Career history
- New England Patriots (1979–1980); Buffalo Bills (1982); Green Bay Packers (1982); Arizona Wranglers (1984); Arizona Outlaws (1985)

Career NFL statistics
- Rushing yards: 140
- Rushing average: 5
- Rushing touchdowns: 3
- Stats at Pro Football Reference

Allan Vincent Clark (born June 8, 1957) is an American former professional football player who was a running back in the National Football League (NFL) who played for the New England Patriots, the Green Bay Packers, and the Buffalo Bills. Clark played collegiate ball for Northern Arizona University before being drafted by the Patriots in the 10th round of the 1979 NFL draft. Clark played professionally for 3 seasons and retired in 1982.
