= Dan Haren =

American baseball player (born 1980)

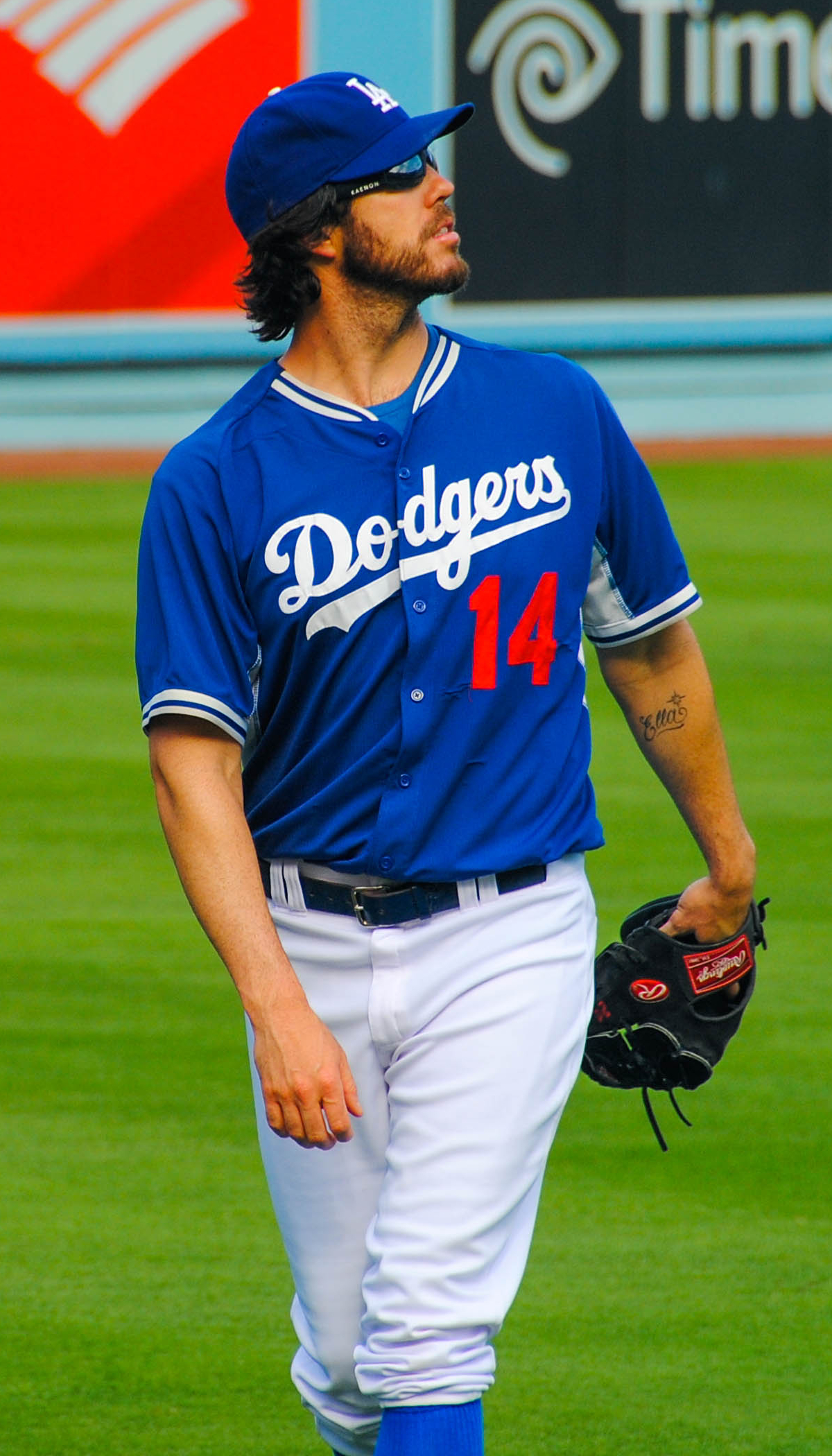
- Haren with Los Angeles Dodgers in 2014
- Pitcher
- Born: September 17, 1980 (age 46); Monterey Park, California, U.S.
- Batted: Right Threw: Right

MLB debut
- June 30, 2003, for the St. Louis Cardinals

Last MLB appearance
- October 4, 2015, for the Chicago Cubs

Career statistics
- Win–loss record: 153–131
- Earned run average: 3.75
- Strikeouts: 2,013
- Stats at Baseball Reference

Teams
- St. Louis Cardinals (2003–2004); Oakland Athletics (2005–2007); Arizona Diamondbacks (2008–2010); Los Angeles Angels of Anaheim (2010–2012); Washington Nationals (2013); Los Angeles Dodgers (2014); Miami Marlins (2015); Chicago Cubs (2015)

Career highlights and awards
- 3× All-Star (2007–2009)

Daniel John Haren (born September 17, 1980) is an American former professional baseball pitcher. Haren played in Major League Baseball (MLB) for the St. Louis Cardinals, Oakland Athletics, Arizona Diamondbacks, Los Angeles Angels of Anaheim, Washington Nationals, Los Angeles Dodgers, Miami Marlins, and Chicago Cubs. He now serves as a pitching strategist with the Diamondbacks.

Haren starred for the baseball teams at Bishop Amat High School and Pepperdine University before the Cardinals selected him in the second round of the 2001 MLB draft. After he made his MLB debut in 2003, the Cardinals traded him to the Athletics to get Mark Mulder. After his first All-Star season in 2007, the Athletics traded him to the Diamondbacks for prospects. After appearing in two more All-Star Games in 2008 and 2009, the Diamondbacks traded him to the Angels during the 2010 season for Joe Saunders and pitching prospects. A free agent after the 2012 season, he pitched for the Nationals in 2013, and then signed with the Dodgers for the 2014 season. The Dodgers traded Haren to Miami after the 2014 season. On July 31, 2015, Haren was traded to the Chicago Cubs for two minor league prospects.

Haren is one of a small number of MLB pitchers to have beaten all 30 Major League teams. Although he was never a particularly well-known player, Haren finished his career with three All Star game appearances and the seventh best strikeout-to-walk ratio in major league history.

== Early life ==
Daniel John Haren was born on September 17, 1980, in Monterey Park, California. Haren attended Bishop Amat High School in La Puente, California, where he played for the school's baseball team as a first baseman. He was named All-San Gabriel Valley.

== College career ==
After he graduated from Bishop Amat, Haren enrolled at Pepperdine University in Malibu, California, on a college baseball scholarship. Playing for the Pepperdine Waves baseball team, he was selected as West Coast Conference (WCC) Freshman of the Year in 1999. As a sophomore in 2000, Haren had an 8-5 win–loss record and a 3.08 earned run average (ERA). In the 2001 season, his junior year, Haren posted a 2.22 ERA in 17 starts, while teammate Noah Lowry posted a 1.71 ERA in 18 starts. Haren was named WCC Player of the Year and Lowry was Pitcher of the Year. Haren also was a Second team College All-America. The teammates skipped their senior seasons, and Lowry was taken in the first round (30th overall) by the San Francisco Giants and Haren was taken in the second round (72nd overall) by the St. Louis Cardinals in the 2001 Major League Baseball draft.

== Professional career ==
=== Draft and minor leagues ===
Haren made his professional debut with the New Jersey Cardinals in 2001 and was 3–3 with a 3.10 ERA in 12 appearances, with eight starts. He also struck out 57 while only walking eight. He then made 28 starts in A-ball in 2002 for the Peoria Chiefs and Potomac Cannons, finishing with a combined ERA of 2.74. He started 2003 in Double-A with the Tennessee Smokies, but was promoted after eight starts to the Triple-A Memphis Redbirds. He was a combined 8–1 with a 2.68 ERA in 16 starts in 2003, with 84 strikeouts and was selected as the Cardinals minor league pitcher of the year.

=== St. Louis Cardinals (2003–2004) ===
Haren made his major league debut at the age of 22, on June 30, 2003. He was the starting pitcher against the San Francisco Giants and allowed four runs (two earned) in six innings to pick up the loss. He recorded his first Major League win with a six-inning start where he allowed only one run against the Los Angeles Dodgers on July 19. After finishing 2003 with a 5.08 ERA for the Cardinals in 14 starts, he was sent back down to AAA Memphis for the 2004 season. He received a late-season call-up, and made five appearances in the postseason for the Cardinals, including two in the World Series. The Cardinals were swept by the Boston Red Sox, but Haren pitched well, tossing 4 2/3 scoreless innings.

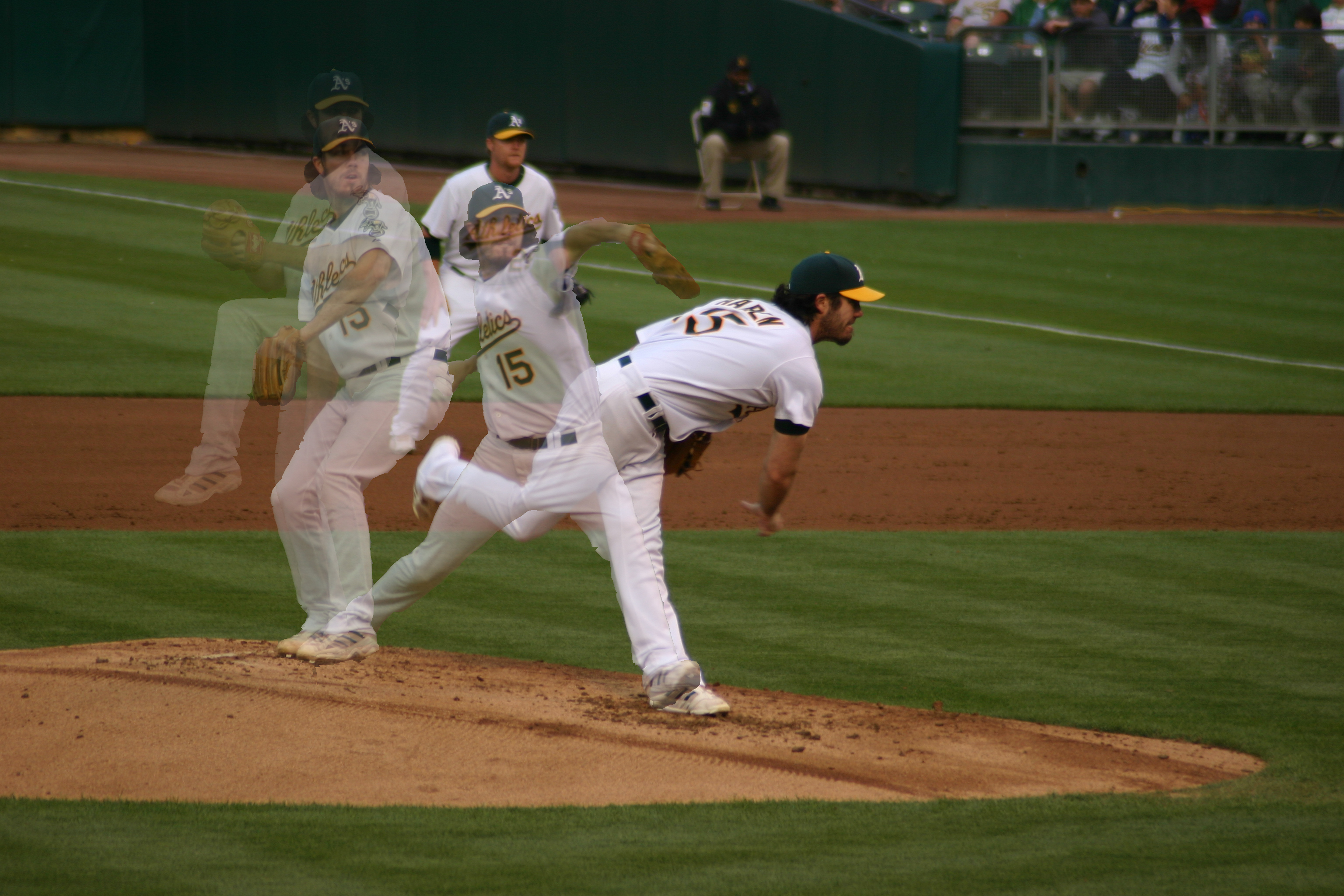
Pitching in a game against the Seattle Mariners

=== Oakland Athletics (2005–2007) ===
After the 2004 season, the Cardinals traded Haren in a package that included right-handed reliever Kiko Calero and top hitting prospect Daric Barton to the Oakland Athletics for Mark Mulder. Haren went 14–12 with a 3.73 ERA in his first full season as a major leaguer.

In 2005, Haren finished in the top 10 in the American League in the following categories: innings pitched (217, ninth place), strikeouts (163, sixth place), and complete games (three, fourth place).

Furthermore, in 2007, Haren had one of the best seasons among any pitcher in the majors. Haren finished in the top ten in the American League in wins, with 15, strikeouts, with 192, innings pitched, with 222 2/3, strikeout to walk ratio, with 3.49, and finished in the top three in the AL in ERA with 3.07. In 2007, he was also selected to start the MLB All Star Game.

=== Arizona Diamondbacks (2008–2010) ===
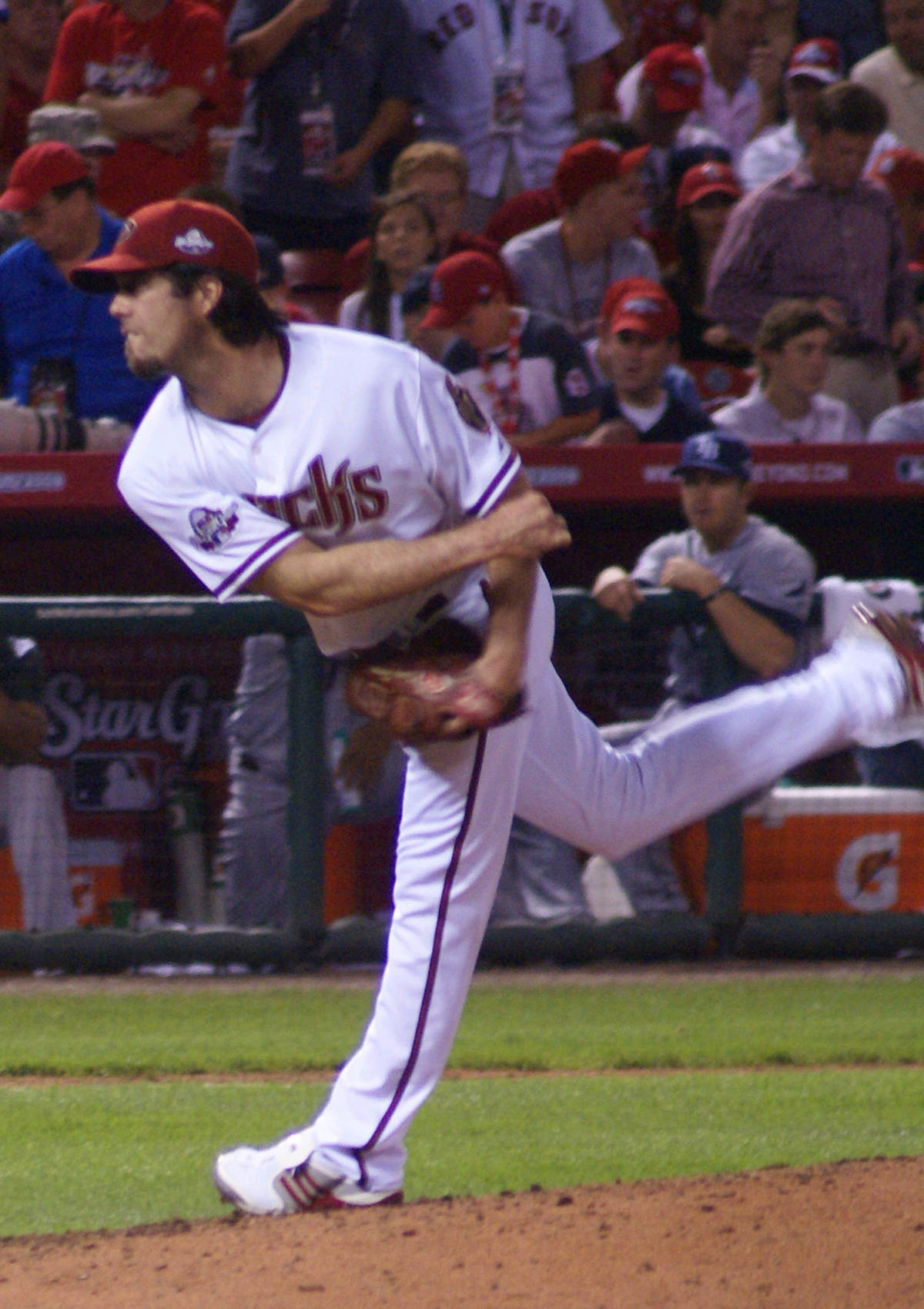
Haren pitching during the 2009 All-Star Game in St. Louis

On December 14, 2007, Haren was traded to the Arizona Diamondbacks, along with Connor Robertson, for prospects including Carlos González, Brett Anderson, Aaron Cunningham, Greg Smith, Dana Eveland, and Chris Carter. In his first season with the Diamondbacks he was selected to the 2008 All-Star Game at Yankee Stadium along with his teammate, Brandon Webb. He finished 2008 with a 3.33 ERA to go along with a 16–8 win–loss record, and a career-high 206 strikeouts in 216 innings. His strikeout to walk ratio of 5.15 was the best in the National League, trailing only Roy Halladay.

On August 6, 2008, Haren agreed to a four-year, $44.75 million contract with a team option for the 2013 season. Haren was also selected as a 2009 NL All-Star, representing the Diamondbacks along with Justin Upton. Haren finished the year with a record of 14–10, 3.14 ERA, and 223 strikeouts in 229 1/3 innings, throwing three complete games in 33 starts. He once again led the National League with a strikeout to walk ratio of 5.87, and ranked third in total number of strikeouts and ninth in strikeouts per nine innings (8.75 K/9). His 1.003 WHIP was the best mark in the big leagues.

In 2009, he was named #33 on the Sporting News' list of the 50 greatest current players in baseball. A panel of 100 baseball people, many of them members of the Baseball Hall of Fame and winners of major baseball awards, was polled to arrive at the list. He began the 2010 season with a 7–8 record and a 4.60 ERA through July 25.

=== Los Angeles Angels of Anaheim (2010–2012) ===
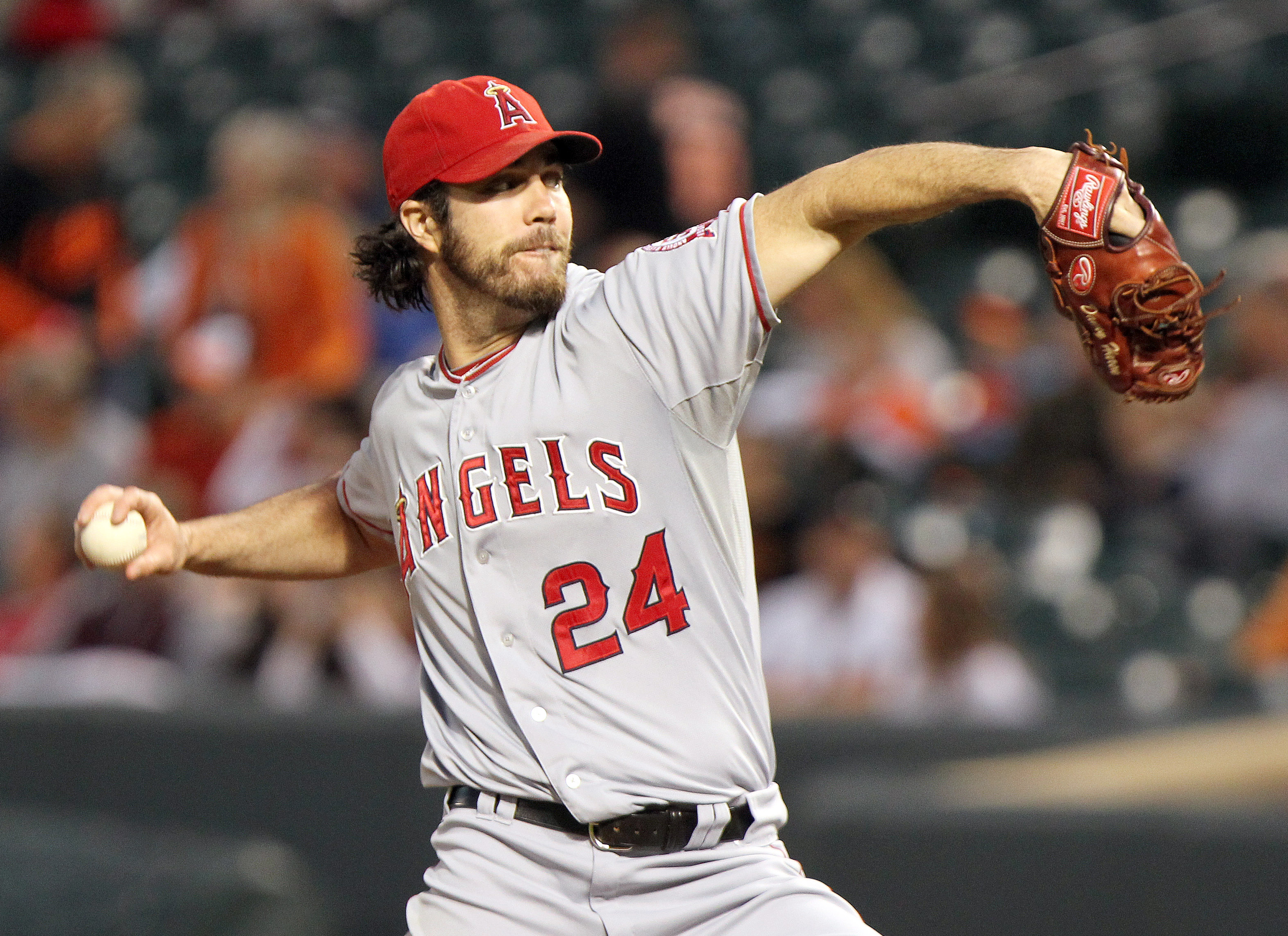
Haren with the Los Angeles Angels in 2011

On July 25, 2010, the Diamondbacks traded Haren to the Los Angeles Angels of Anaheim for starting pitcher Joe Saunders, and minor league pitchers Rafael Rodríguez, Patrick Corbin, and Tyler Skaggs. In 13 games with the Angels to close out the 2010 season, Haren went 5–4 with 75 strikeouts and a 2.87 ERA. His final numbers for the entire season were a 12–12 record, 3.91 ERA, 216 strikeouts and 235 innings in 35 starts.

2011 saw a rebound from Haren, as he pitched to a 16–11 record with a 3.17 ERA in 35 games (34 starts). He struck out 192 in 238 1/3 innings and led the American League with a 5.82 strikeout to walk ratio, while throwing a career high four complete games (three shutouts).

On May 24, 2012, Haren recorded a career-high 14 strikeouts in a complete-game shutout against the Seattle Mariners in Seattle, allowing four hits in a 3–0 victory. On November 2, 2012, after an attempt to trade him to the Chicago Cubs for Carlos Mármol fell through, the Angels declined Haren's $15.5 million option, instead buying it out for $3.5 million, and he became a free agent.

=== Washington Nationals (2013) ===
On December 7, 2012, Haren signed a one-year, $13 million contract with the Washington Nationals. After his June 22, 2013, start against the Colorado Rockies, Haren owned a major league-worst 6.15 ERA amongst qualified starters. He had also given up a league-leading number of home runs with 19 home runs surrendered through 15 starts.

Haren was placed on the 15-day disabled list on June 25 with right shoulder inflammation. He later explained that the disabled list stint was more for "mental reasons than physical reasons," as he was lonely with his family remaining in California. Haren finished the 2013 season 10–14 with a 4.67 ERA. After starting the season with a 4–11 record and a 5.79 ERA in his first 18 games, he finished the season with a 6–3 record and a 3.14 ERA in his final 13 games.

=== Los Angeles Dodgers (2014) ===
On November 25, 2013, Haren signed to a one-year, $10 million deal with the Los Angeles Dodgers. The deal included a vesting option for 2015, which became a player option when he pitched 180 innings in 2014. Haren started the season strong, winning five of his first six decisions. However, around the all-star break he had a brief stretch where he pitched poorly, losing five straight starts from July 5 to August 1. He turned it around again and pitched well down the stretch. He finished with a record of 13–11 and an ERA of 4.02 in 32 starts for the Dodgers in 2014. For the year, he finished second in the league in home runs allowed with 27.

After the season, Haren exercised his player option for the 2015 season. Regarding rumors that the Dodgers might trade him, Haren said he only wanted to pitch in Los Angeles, either for the Dodgers or the Angels, and that he had "no interest" in playing for anyone else.

=== Miami Marlins (2015) ===
On December 10, 2014, the Dodgers traded Haren, Dee Gordon, and Miguel Rojas, to the Miami Marlins in exchange for Andrew Heaney, Chris Hatcher, Austin Barnes, and Enrique Hernández. He voiced his preference to pitch for a team on the West Coast. Although it was reported that Haren had requested a trade, he reported to spring training with the Marlins and denied having requested a trade.

=== Chicago Cubs (2015) ===
On July 31, 2015, the Marlins traded Haren to the Chicago Cubs for minor leaguers Elliot Soto and Ivan Pineyro. Haren announced he would retire after the 2015 season. Haren stated, "If I don't pitch in the postseason, that's it. It's been fun. Hopefully there's a lot more games to go. If my name is called, I'll be ready." Between the Marlins and Cubs, Haren went 11–9 with a 3.60 ERA in 32 starts.

== Pitching style ==
Haren threw an 89–92-mile-per-hour (143–148 km/h) four-seam fastball, an 89–92-mile-per-hour (143–148 km/h) two-seam fastball, a sharp 84–86-mile-per-hour (135–138 km/h) split-finger fastball, and a 76–79-mile-per-hour (122–127 km/h) spike curve. Haren had also added and relied heavily upon an 85–87-mile-per-hour (137–140 km/h) cut fastball, which he added in 2008 and had credited with rejuvenating his career. The cut fastball made up more than half of his pitch selection to right-handed hitters, with his fastballs and occasional split-finger fastball filling up most of the rest. Against lefties, Haren mixed all of his pitches but used his two-seam fastball the most. His curveball was a change-of-pace pitch, and not a main weapon; he didn't throw it much to right-handers or in two-strike counts. By contrast, he threw about half of his splitters with two strikes.

Haren usually had a slow pitching delivery, highlighted by a slight pause in the middle of his windup, that he sped up with runners on base. His pitching style was often dubbed a "chess match" by reporters and announcers (particularly Daron Sutton and Mark Grace of the Diamondbacks' announcing team) due to his ability to change speeds and throw nearly any pitch in any count (and often throw pitches in succession, i.e., four straight breaking balls), often going against scouting reports, making it particularly difficult to hit him.

== Personal life ==
Haren grew up in West Covina, California. He is of Irish and Mexican descent. He and his wife have two children, and live in Orange County, California.

In December 2016, the Diamondbacks hired Haren as a special pitching assistant, applying sabermetrics and other baseball analytics. His current title with the organization is pitching strategist.

== See also ==
- List of Major League Baseball career strikeout leaders
- 2021 Baseball Hall of Fame balloting

Awards and achievements
Preceded by Kenny Rogers	American League All-Star Game Starting Pitcher; 2007	Succeeded by Cliff Lee
Preceded by Roy Halladay	American League Pitcher of the month May 2007	Succeeded by J. J. Putz
Preceded by Todd Wellemeyer	National League Pitcher of the month June 2008	Succeeded by CC Sabathia
