= Marcus Hatley =

American baseball player (born 1988)

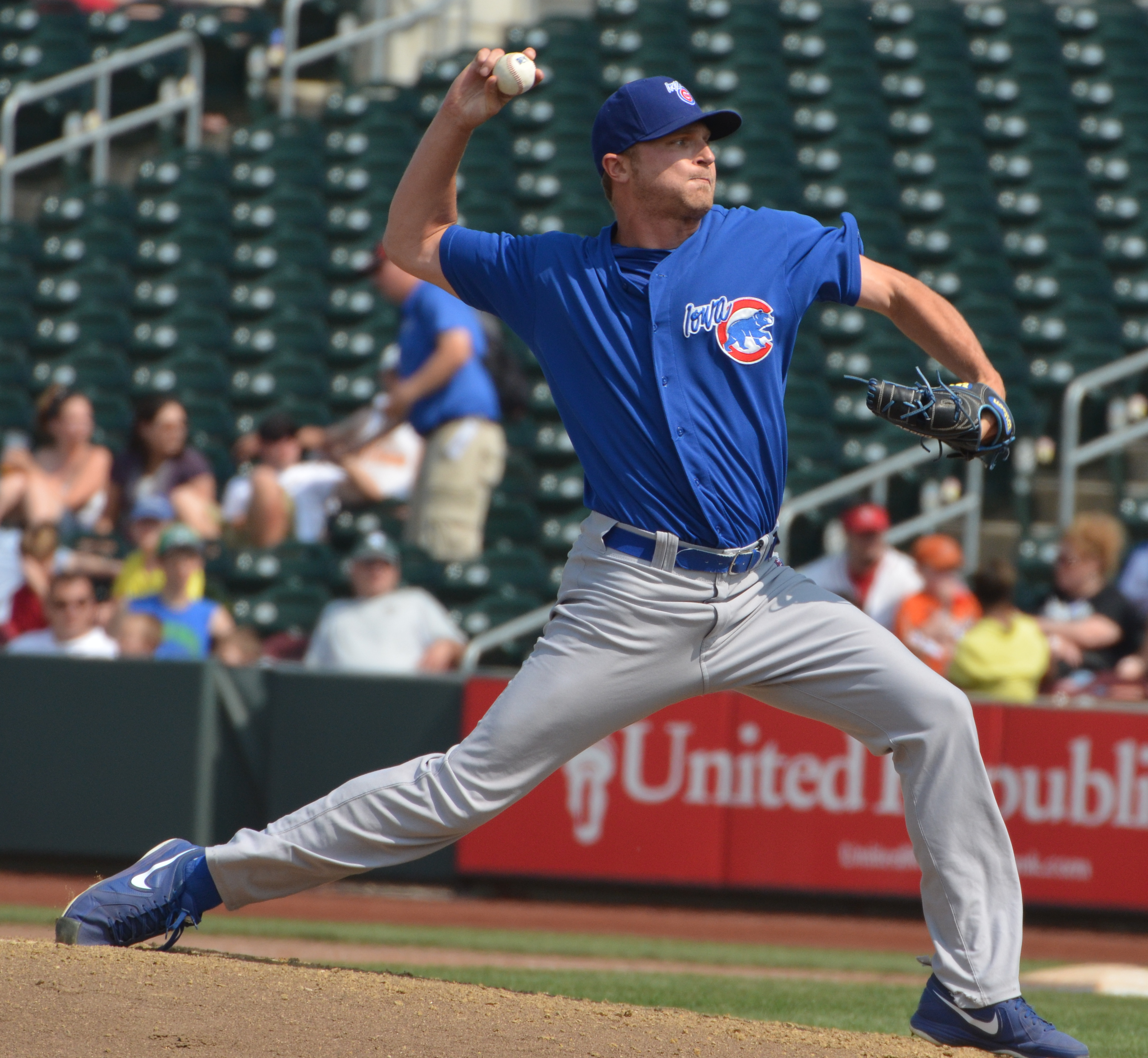
- Hatley pitching the Iowa Cubs, triple-A affiliates of the Chicago Cubs, in 2013
- Pitcher
- Born: March 26, 1988 (age 38); Honolulu, Hawaii, U.S.
- Batted: Right Threw: Right

MLB debut
- July 1, 2015, for the St. Louis Cardinals

Last appearance
- July 7, 2015, for the St. Louis Cardinals

MLB statistics
- Win–loss record: 0–0
- Earned run average: 0.00
- Strikeouts: 2
- Stats at Baseball Reference

Teams
- St. Louis Cardinals (2015)

Marcus Allen Hatley (born March 26, 1988) is an American former professional baseball pitcher. He played in Major League Baseball (MLB) for the St. Louis Cardinals.

== Career ==
=== Chicago Cubs ===
Hatley was drafted by the Chicago Cubs in the 39th round of the 2006 Major League Baseball draft out of Mission Hills High School in San Marcos, California. Under the rules at the time, the Cubs would retain his draft rights until a week before the following year's draft. He did not sign in 2006 and instead enrolled at Palomar College where he played a season of college baseball primarily as an outfielder with only two innings pitched. The Cubs chose to sign him as a pitcher, however, after noticing his fastball velocity in a 2007 pre-draft workout. He played in the Cubs organization until 2014.

=== St. Louis Cardinals ===
Prior to the 2015 season, Hatley signed with the St. Louis Cardinals. The Cardinals called him up to a major league roster for the first time in his professional career on June 30, 2015 after an injury to Matt Belisle. After two scoreless appearances from the bullpen, the club designated him for assignment on July 31. They reassigned him to the Triple–A Memphis Redbirds and outrighted him off the 40-man roster on August 3. He became a free agent on November 6, 2015.
