= Terrell Burgess =

American football player (born 1998)

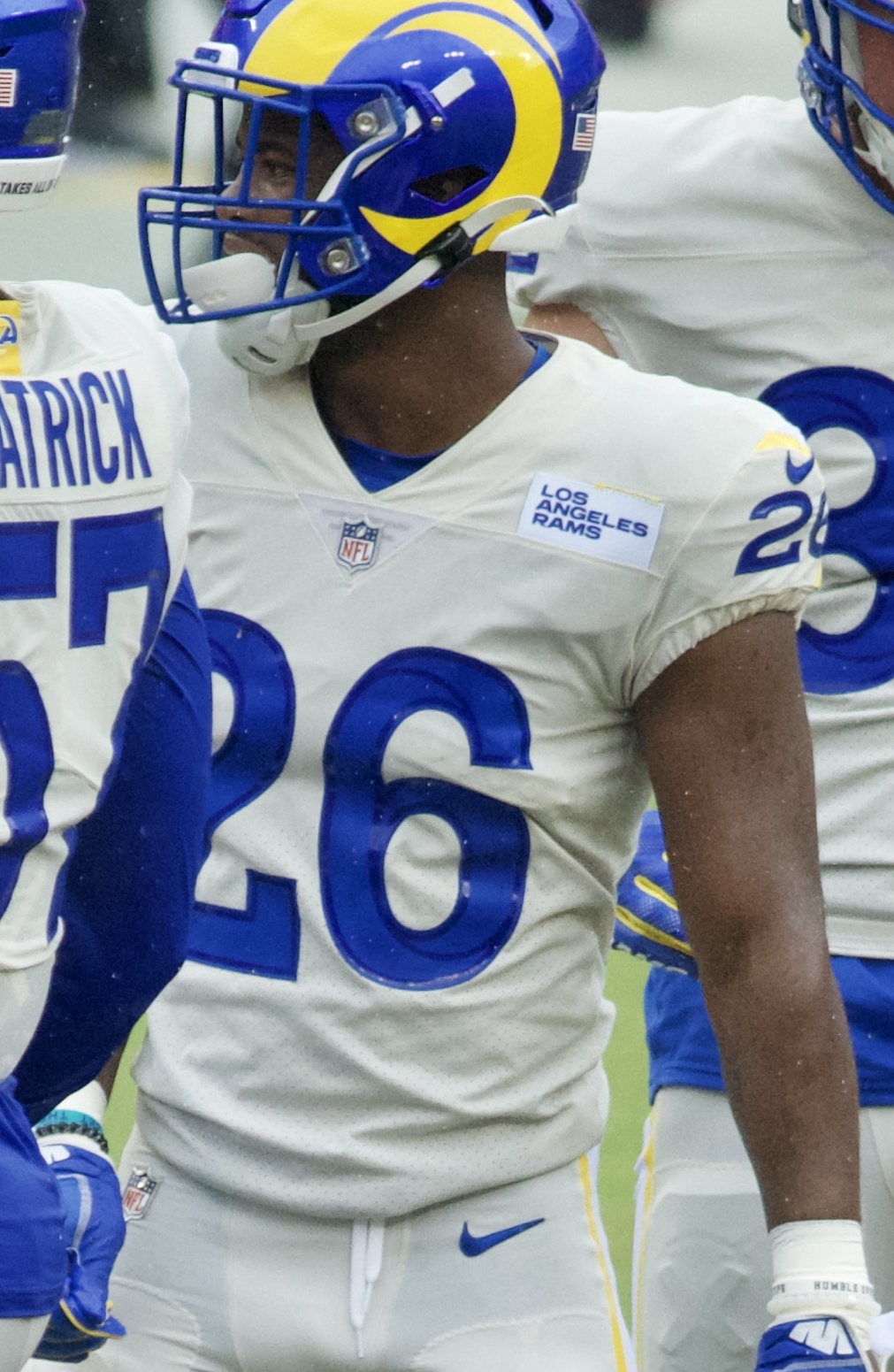
- Burgess with the Los Angeles Rams in 2020

No. 38 – Tennessee Titans
- Position: Safety
- Roster status: Active

Personal information
- Born: November 12, 1998 (age 27); Oceanside, California, U.S.
- Listed height: 5 ft 11 in (1.80 m)
- Listed weight: 202 lb (92 kg)

Career information
- High school: San Marcos (San Marcos, California)
- College: Utah (2016–2019)
- NFL draft: 2020: 3rd round, 104th overall pick

Career history
- Los Angeles Rams (2020–2022); New York Giants (2022); Washington Commanders (2023); Buffalo Bills (2024)*; New Orleans Saints (2025); Tennessee Titans (2026–present)
- * Offseason or practice squad member only

Awards and highlights
- Super Bowl champion (LVI)

Career NFL statistics as of 2025
- Tackles: 76
- Pass deflections: 4
- Stats at Pro Football Reference

Terrell Joseph-Nathaniel Burgess (born November 12, 1998) is an American professional football safety for the Tennessee Titans of the National Football League (NFL). He played college football for the Utah Utes and was drafted by the Los Angeles Rams in the third round of the 2020 NFL draft. Burgess won Super Bowl LVI with the Rams and has also been a member of the New York Giants, Washington Commanders, New Orleans Saints, and Buffalo Bills.

== Early life ==
Burgess attended San Marcos High School in San Marcos, California. He played defensive back and wide receiver in high school. He committed to the University of Utah to play college football.

== College career ==
Burgess played at Utah from 2016 to 2019. After spending his first three seasons as mostly a backup, he was a full-time starter his senior year in 2019. As a senior in 2019, Burgess started all 14 games, recording 81 tackles, one interception, two fumble recoveries, and five pass breakups. He was named honorable mention All-Pac 12 for his efforts.

== Professional career ==
Pre-draft measurables
Height	Weight	Arm length	Hand span	Wingspan	40-yard dash	10-yard split	20-yard split	Vertical jump	Broad jump	Bench press	Wonderlic
5 ft 11 3/8 in (1.81 m)	202 lb (92 kg)	29 1/2 in (0.75 m)	9 1/4 in (0.23 m)	5 ft 11 3/8 in (1.81 m)	4.46 s	1.53 s	2.60 s	33.5 in (0.85 m)	10 ft 2 in (3.10 m)	20 reps	17
All values from NFL Combine

=== Los Angeles Rams ===
Burgess was drafted by the Los Angeles Rams with the 104th overall pick in the third round of the 2020 NFL draft. He suffered a broken ankle in Week 7 and was placed on injured reserve on October 27, 2020. Burgess won Super Bowl LVI when the Rams defeated the Cincinnati Bengals. He was waived on November 8, 2022.

=== New York Giants ===
On November 10, 2022, the New York Giants signed Burgess to their practice squad. On November 23, Burgess was elevated from the practice squad for week 12 game against the Dallas Cowboys. On January 26, 2023, Burgess signed a reserve/future contract with the Giants.

On May 6, 2023, Burgess was waived by the Giants with a failed physical designation.

=== Washington Commanders ===
Burgess signed with the Washington Commanders on May 30, 2023. He was waived on August 29, and re-signed to the practice squad. On October 10, Burgess was signed to the active roster.

=== Buffalo Bills ===
On July 31, 2024, Burgess signed a one-year contract with the Buffalo Bills. He was placed on injured reserve on August 25, and released a week later.

=== New Orleans Saints ===
On May 12, 2025, Burgess signed with the New Orleans Saints. He was released on August 26 as part of final roster cuts and re-signed to the practice squad the next day. On September 17, Burgess was signed to the active roster.

On March 26, 2026, Burgess re-signed with the Saints on a one-year contract. On August 30, he was released by New Orleans as a part of final roster cuts.

=== Tennessee Titans ===
On August 31, 2026, Burgess was claimed off of waivers by the Tennessee Titans.
