= Elliot Soto =

American baseball player (born 1989)

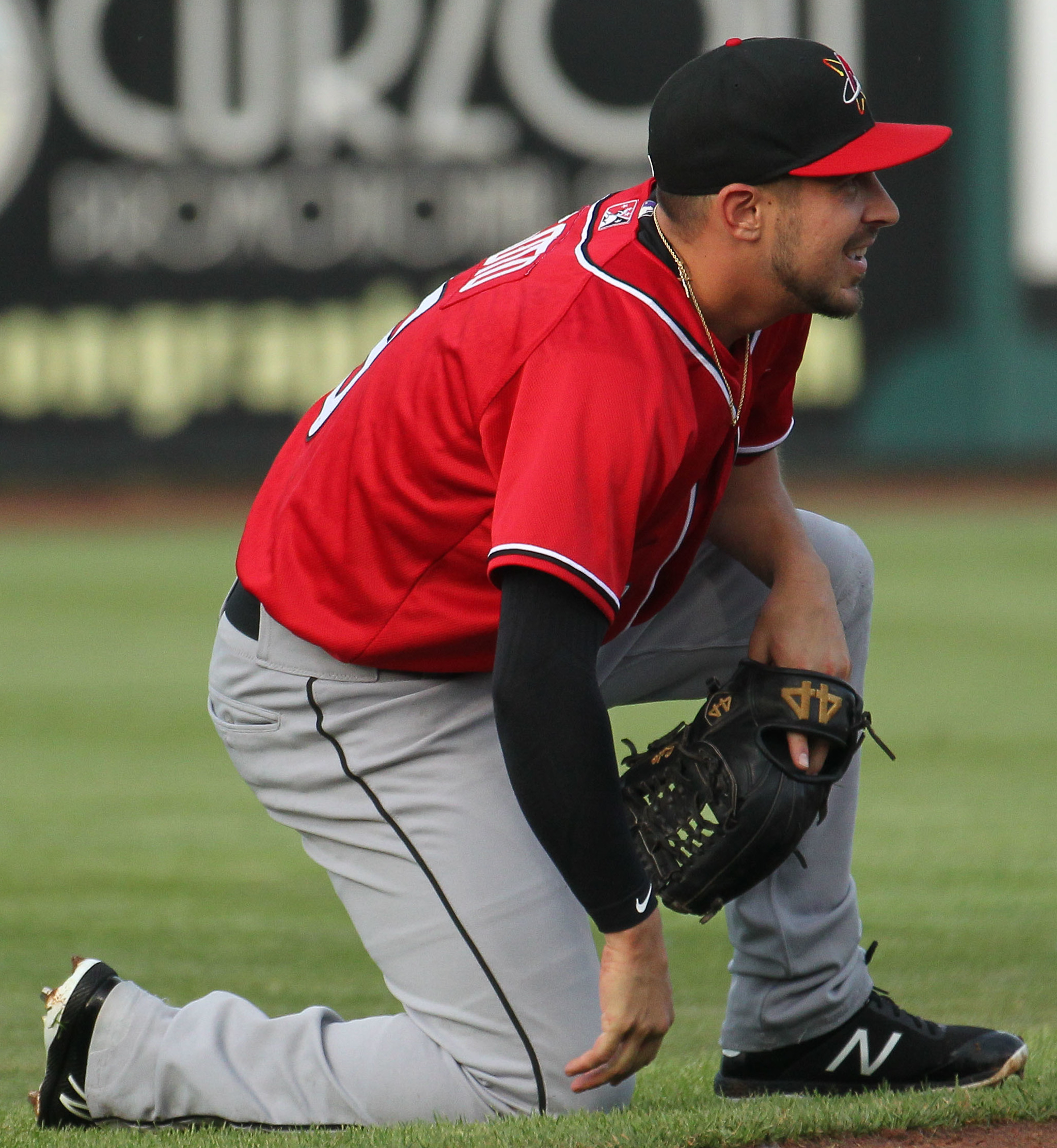
- Soto with the Albuquerque Isotopes in 2019

Free agent
- Infielder
- Born: August 21, 1989 (age 36); Elgin, Illinois, U.S.
- Bats: Right Throws: Right

MLB debut
- September 25, 2020, for the Los Angeles Angels

MLB statistics (through 2020 season)
- Batting average: .333
- Home runs: 0
- Runs batted in: 0
- Stats at Baseball Reference

Teams
- Los Angeles Angels (2020)

Elliot Sebastian Soto (born August 21, 1989) is an American professional baseball infielder who is a free agent. After spending 10 seasons in the minors, Soto made his Major League Baseball (MLB) debut for the Los Angeles Angels on September 25, 2020.

== Amateur career ==
A native of Elgin, Illinois, Soto attended Dundee-Crown High School. He was selected by the Minnesota Twins in the 13th round of the 2007 MLB draft, but chose to attend Creighton University, where he played college baseball for the Creighton Bluejays. In 2009, he played collegiate summer baseball with the Hyannis Mets of the Cape Cod Baseball League. He was selected by the Chicago Cubs in the 15th round of the 2010 MLB draft.

== Career ==
=== Chicago Cubs ===
Soto spent his first year in the minors primarily with the Low–A Boise Hawks, but had briefs stints in Rookie and Single–A ball for the Cubs. In 52 games that year, he hit .272. In 2011, Soto appeared in 112 games combined between the Single–A Peoria Chiefs and High–A Daytona Cubs, hitting .271.

In 2012, Soto was promoted to Double-A where he spent the majority of the season with the Tennessee Smokies, hitting .220/.310/.282 in 82 games. In 2013, Soto split time between Tennessee and Daytona hitting .219 with 2 home runs in 84 games. Soto got promoted to Triple-A Iowa in 2014, and .241 in a 29-game stint with the Cubs.

=== Miami Marlins ===
On July 31, 2015, Soto was traded to the Miami Marlins along with Ivan Pineyro in exchange for Dan Haren. He spent the entire 2015 season with the Double–A Jacksonville Suns, hitting .256/.366/.292 in 120 games. Soto spent his entire 2016 season with the Triple–A New Orleans Zephyrs, hitting .241 in 62 games. He elected free agency following the season on November 7, 2016.

=== Chicago Cubs (second stint) ===
On December 14, 2016, Soto signed a minor league contract to return to the Chicago Cubs organization. For the 2017 season, Soto played all his 81 games with the Triple-A Iowa Cubs, and hit .238 with 2 home runs. He elected free agency following the season on November 6, 2017.

=== Colorado Rockies ===
That offseason, Soto briefly signed with Acereros del Norte of the Mexican League before signing with the Colorado Rockies. He played the 2018 season with the Triple-A Albuquerque Isotopes, hitting .286/.347/.382 over 81 games. Soto elected free agency following the season on November 2, 2018.

On March 11, 2019, Soto re–signed with the Rockies on a minor league contract, and returned to the Isotopes, where he had his best offensive season of his minor league career. In 112 appearances, Soto hit .305 with an .860 OPS and a career–high 10 home runs. He elected free agency following the season on November 4.

=== Los Angeles Angels ===
On December 23, 2019, Soto signed a minor league contract with the Los Angeles Angels that included an invitation to spring training. On September 22, 2020, the Angels selected his contract following Andrelton Simmons's decision to opt out of the rest of the shortened 2020 season. He made his debut on September 25, appearing as a pinch runner in a 9-5 Angels loss. The next day, he made his first career start, and after teammate Jahmai Jones notched his first career hit, Soto went back-to-back with a single in his first at bat, becoming the first pair in Angels history to record back-to-back first career hits. On October 30, Soto was outrighted off of the 40-man roster. He became a free agent on November 2.

=== Los Angeles Dodgers ===
On December 18, 2020, Soto signed a minor league contract with the Los Angeles Dodgers that included an invite to Spring Training. He spent the entire season in Triple-A with the Oklahoma City Dodgers, where he hit .230 in 54 games. Soto became a free agent following the season.

=== Minnesota Twins ===
On February 21, 2022, Soto signed a minor league contract with the Minnesota Twins. He had his contract selected on June 13, 2022 and was designated for assignment the next day without appearing in a game. He cleared waivers and was outrighted to the Triple-A St. Paul Saints on June 16. He elected free agency following the season on October 10.

On November 23, 2022, the Twins re-signed Soto to a minor league deal. He returned to St. Paul, where he spent the entirety of the season, hitting .213/.282/.299 with one home run, 13 RBI, and 9 stolen bases across 53 contests. Soto elected free agency following the season on November 6, 2023.

=== Los Angeles Angels (second stint) ===
On April 16, 2024, Soto signed a minor league contract to return to the Los Angeles Angels organization. He made 114 appearances for the Triple-A Salt Lake Bees, slashing .224/.323/.307 with four home runs, 44 RBI, and 21 stolen bases. Soto elected free agency following the season on November 4.
