= Memorial Stadium (Boise) =

Baseball park in Boise, Idaho, U.S.

- Location in the United States Location in Idaho
- Interactive map of Memorial Stadium
- Address: 5600 N. Glenwood Street, Boise, Idaho, U.S.
- Location: Ada County, Idaho
- Coordinates: 43.656°N 116.279°W
- Elevation: 2,610 ft (795 m)
- Owner: Memorial Stadium Inc.
- Operator: Memorial Stadium Inc.
- Capacity: 3,452
- Surface: Natural grass
- Field size: LF: 330 ft (101 m); CF: 400 ft (122 m); RF: 330 ft (101 m)

Construction
- Groundbreaking: February 1, 1989
- Opened: June 16, 1989; 37 years ago
- Cost: $2.3 million ($5.97 million in 2025)
- Architect: CSHQA
- General contractors: Wright Brothers; Building Co.

Tenants
- Boise Hawks (NWL/Pioneer League) (1989–present); Boise State Broncos baseball (2020–present)

Memorial Stadium is an outdoor baseball park in the western United States in unincorporated Ada County, Idaho, adjacent to the Western Idaho Fairgrounds on the banks of the Boise River. While not physically located within the city of Boise, the stadium has a Boise postal address.

It is the home field of the Boise Hawks of the independent Pioneer League and the home of the Boise State Broncos baseball team. The stadium has a current seating capacity of 3,452.

The stadium opened in 1989, 37 years ago, with several significant improvements over time. Privately built by an investor group led by Bill Pereira and general manager Fred Kuenzi, its natural grass playing field is aligned northeast (home plate to second base) at an approximate elevation of 2,610 feet (795 m) above sea level.

== Hawks' history ==
After moving from the Tri-Cities after the 1986 season, the renamed Boise Hawks continued as an independent in the Northwest League and played their first two seasons at Bill Wigle Field on the campus of Borah High School. They moved to Memorial Stadium in 1989 and became an affiliate of the California Angels organization in 1990. The Hawks' relationship with the Angels lasted for 11 years before a change to the Chicago Cubs in 2001. The Hawks made another affiliation change to the Colorado Rockies in 2015.

Since their arrival in 1987, the Hawks have won four league titles (1991, 1993–1995) and during the tenure of manager Tom Kotchman, the Hawks won 835 games.

In 2002, Steve McFarland became manager of the Hawks and since then, the Hawks have won two league championships and three divisional titles.

== Previous teams ==
Starting in 1939, Boise was a longtime member of the Pioneer League. The teams were originally known as the Pilots, and later as the Yankees (1952–53) and Braves (1955–63). They played at Airway Park, about a half-mile (0.8 km) east of Albertsons Stadium, in Municipal Park (now Kristin Armstrong M.P.) in east Boise, now the site of the headquarters of the state's fish & game department. (photo - 1950s) The present-day campus of Boise State University was the site of the original Boise airport, Varney Field, until 1940. In its final years, the ballpark was known as "Braves Field."

The last season of the Pioneer League in Boise was 1963 and the city went eleven summers without minor league baseball.

Boise's original team in the Northwest League was the Boise A's of 1975 and 1976. Fresh from Oakland Technical High School, future hall of famer Rickey Henderson was a member of the 1976 team as a 17-year-old. The independent Buckskins debuted in 1978, but after a 23–49 (.319) season, the team folded. Both teams played their home games at Bill Wigle Field, then known as "Borah Field." Boise went without minor league baseball for eight summers until the Hawks arrived in 1987.
