= Vallecitos =

Vallecitos may refer to:

== Places ==
- Vallecitos, an unincorporated community in San Diego County, California; see also Vallecito, San Diego County, California
- Vallecitos de Zaragoza, a town in Guerrero, Mexico
- Vallecitos, New Mexico, an unincorporated community in Rio Arriba County, New Mexico

== Other ==
- Vallecitos Nuclear Center a nuclear reactor in Alameda County, California
- Vallecitos, a ski resort in Argentina
- Vallecitos Water District, a public agency in San Diego County, California that provides water, wastewater and reclamation services
