= Fred Warner (American football) =

American football player (born 1996)

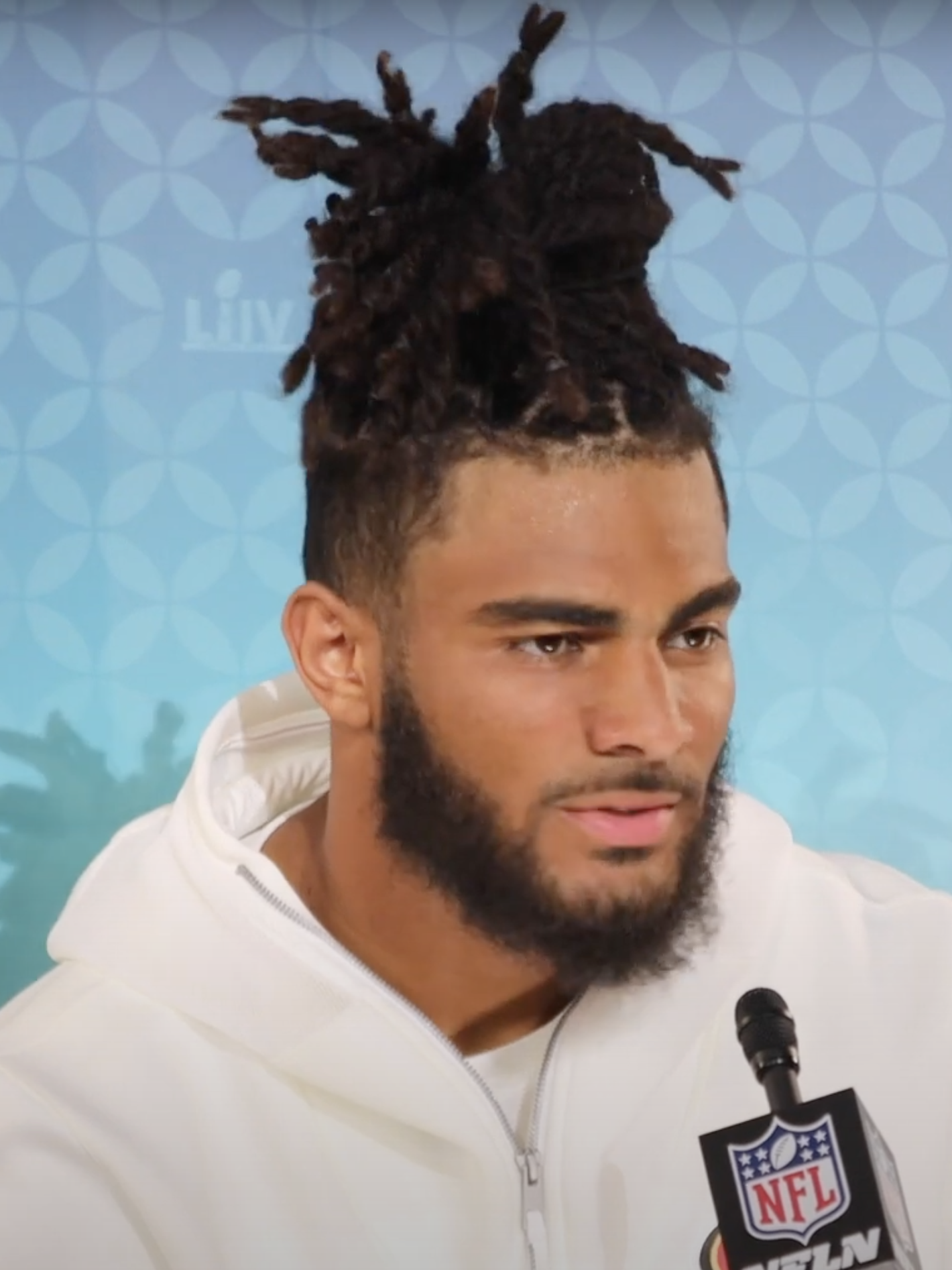
- Warner in 2020

No. 54 – San Francisco 49ers
- Position: Linebacker
- Roster status: Active

Personal information
- Born: November 19, 1996 (age 29); San Marcos, California, U.S.
- Listed height: 6 ft 3 in (1.91 m)
- Listed weight: 230 lb (104 kg)

Career information
- High school: Mission Hills (San Marcos)
- College: BYU (2014–2017)
- NFL draft: 2018: 3rd round, 70th overall pick

Career history
- San Francisco 49ers (2018–present)

Awards and highlights
- 4× First-team All-Pro (2020, 2022–2024); 4× Pro Bowl (2020, 2022–2024)

Career NFL statistics as of Week 7, 2026
- Total tackles: 1,019
- Sacks: 10.5
- Forced fumbles: 20
- Fumble recoveries: 7
- Interceptions: 10
- Pass deflections: 59
- Defensive touchdowns: 2
- Stats at Pro Football Reference

Federico Anthony Warner (born November 19, 1996) is an American professional football linebacker for the San Francisco 49ers of the National Football League (NFL). He played college football for the BYU Cougars and was selected by the 49ers in the third round of the 2018 NFL draft.

== Early life ==
Warner was born on November 19, 1996, in San Marcos, California, to Laura and Fred Warner, the eldest of two sons and one daughter. He is Mexican American from his mother's side and African and Panamanian from his father's side. His parents separated when Warner was a toddler, and his mother raised him and his siblings as a single parent. After experimenting with different sports, Warner began playing football when he was seven, which both he and his mother have cited as helping to shape his teenage years by giving him a sense of community. Though he admired numerous San Diego Chargers players, Warner grew up as a fan of the Dallas Cowboys along with his father.

At Mission Hills High School, Warner played as a linebacker on the football team and became a starter his junior year with the varsity team, where he was recognized for his strengths as an outside linebacker and was subsequently named the All-San Diego Section Defensive Player of the Year. Warner was also named to the All-California First-team by USA Today and the Cal-Hi Sports All-State First-team and earned the title of Avocado East League Defensive Player of the Year.

Warner was raised in the Church of Jesus Christ of Latter-day Saints and after mentioning his football ambitions to a fellow member of his congregation, who was a Brigham Young University (BYU) alum, he helped to get Warner's highlight reel to Kelly Poppinga, who became his lead recruiter.

College recruiting
Name	Hometown	School	Height	Weight	Commit date
Fred Warner; LB	San Marcos, California	Mission Hills High School	6 ft 3 in (1.91 m)	210 lb (95 kg)	Apr 3, 2013
Fred Warner; LB	Recruit ratings: Scout: Rivals: 247Sports: (80)				
Overall recruit ranking:
Note: In many cases, Scout, Rivals, 247Sports, On3, and ESPN may conflict in their listings of height and weight.; In these cases, the average was taken. ESPN grades are on a 100-point scale.; Sources: "2014 Team Ranking". Rivals.com.

== College career ==
As a true freshman at BYU, Warner registered 24 total tackles, one tackle for loss, one interception (which was returned for a touchdown) and one pass breakup. Warner stepped into the starting role as a sophomore, making 67 total tackles, 11.5 tackles for loss, four sacks, two interceptions and four fumble recoveries. As a junior, Warner recorded 86 total tackles, 10.5 tackles for loss, 1.5 sacks, three interceptions (returning one for a touchdown), two forced fumbles and six pass breakups. As a senior, Warner was named as the team captain and led the team with 87 total tackles, nine tackles for loss, one sack, along with one interception, one forced fumble, one fumble recovery and five pass breakups.

In four years with the Cougars, Warner was a three-year starter and registered 264 total tackles, 32 tackles for loss, 6.5 sacks, seven interceptions (returning two for touchdowns), five fumble recoveries, three forced fumbles and 13 pass breakups. His seven career interceptions rank second in school history among linebackers, tied with Kyle Van Noy.

== Professional career ==
=== Pre-draft ===
On November 20, 2017, it was announced that Warner had accepted his invitation to play in the 2018 Senior Bowl. On January 27, 2018, Warner recorded six combined tackles as part of Denver Broncos' head coach Vance Joseph's North team that lost 45–16 to the South coached by Houston Texans' head coach Bill O'Brien. His overall performance throughout the week impressed scouts and helped him add value to his draft stock. He attended the NFL Scouting Combine and completed all of the combine drills. He finished 13th among all linebackers in the 40-yard dash, eighth in the bench press, ninth in the short shuttle, and sixth in the three-cone drill. Warner attended pre-draft visits and private workouts with multiple teams, including the San Francisco 49ers, Broncos, and Buffalo Bills. At the conclusion of the pre-draft process, Warner was projected to be a second round pick by the majority of NFL draft experts and scouts. He was ranked the fourth best outside linebacker in the draft by Scouts Inc. and was ranked the sixth best outside linebacker by DraftScout.com.

Pre-draft measurables
Height	Weight	Arm length	Hand span	Wingspan	40-yard dash	10-yard split	20-yard split	20-yard shuttle	Three-cone drill	Vertical jump	Broad jump	Bench press	Wonderlic
6 ft 3 3/8 in (1.91 m)	236 lb (107 kg)	32 in (0.81 m)	9 3/4 in (0.25 m)	6 ft 5 in (1.96 m)	4.64 s	1.53 s	2.65 s	4.28 s	6.90 s	38.5 in (0.98 m)	9 ft 11 in (3.02 m)	21 reps	32
All values from NFL Combine

=== 2018 season ===
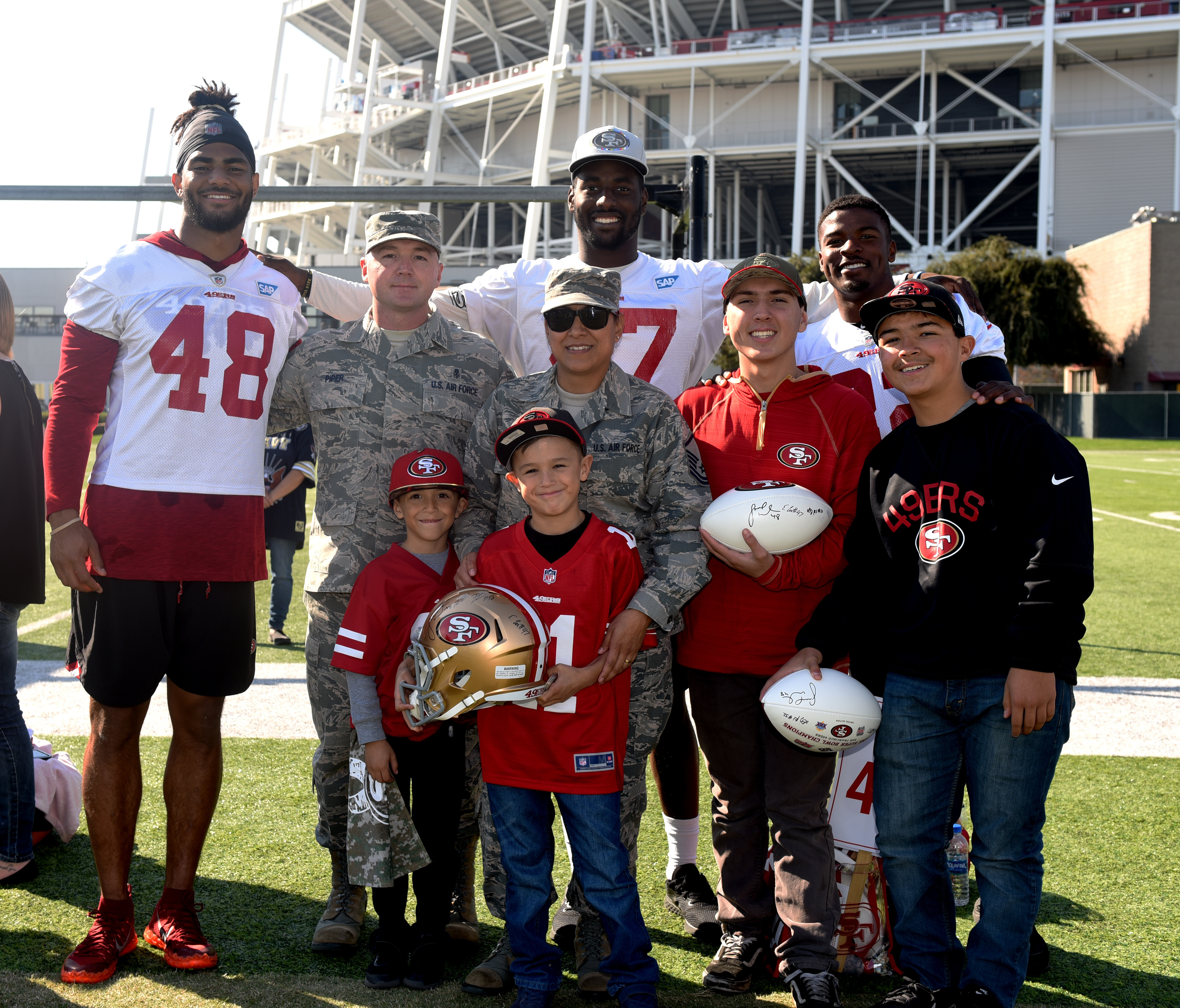
Warner (left) taking a photo with members of the US Air Force in 2018.

The 49ers selected Warner in the third round with the 70th overall pick in the 2018 NFL draft. Warner was the ninth linebacker drafted in 2018.

On June 13, 2018, the 49ers signed Warner to a four-year, US$3.97 million contract that includes a signing bonus of $1.01 million. Throughout training camp, Warner competed against Brock Coyle to be the starting middle linebacker. Head coach Kyle Shanahan named Warner the starting middle linebacker to begin the season. He started alongside outside linebackers Mark Nzeocha and Malcolm Smith.

Warner made his NFL debut and first start in the season-opener against the Minnesota Vikings and recorded 12 combined tackles (11 solo tackles), one pass defended, and one forced fumble during a 24–16 road loss. In the regular-season finale, he collected a season-high 14 combined tackles (nine solo) in a 48–32 road loss to the Los Angeles Rams in Week 17. Warner started all 16 games during his rookie year and recorded 124 combined tackles (85 solo), six pass deflections, and one forced fumble. Warner's 124 total tackles finished 12th among all players and third among all rookies in 2018.

=== 2019 season ===
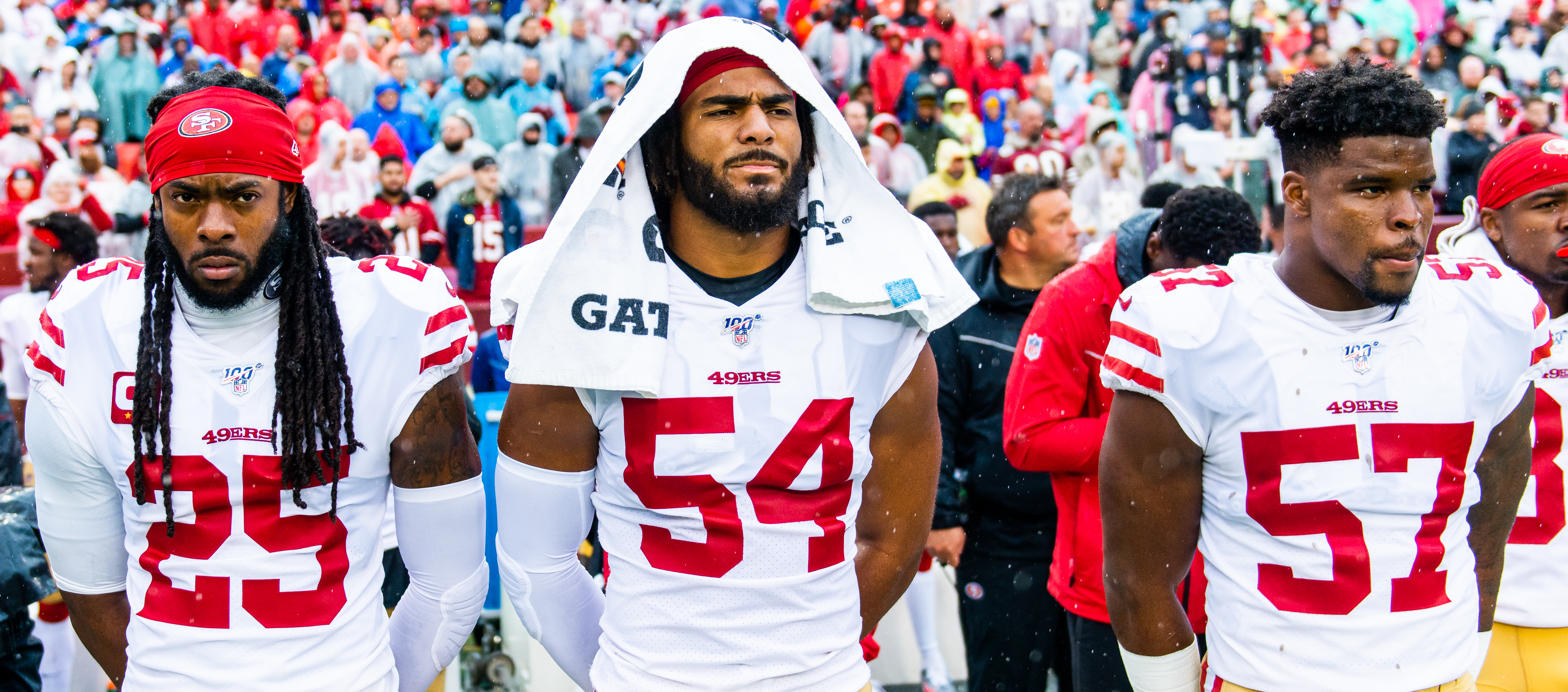
Warner alongside Richard Sherman and Dre Greenlaw in a game against the Washington Redskins

Warner announced he would change his number from 48 to 54 for the 2019 season, after the departure of Cassius Marsh. In Week 10 against the Seattle Seahawks on Monday Night Football, Warner recorded a team high 10 tackles, sacked Russell Wilson twice, and forced a fumble on offensive tackle Germain Ifedi which was recovered by teammate DeForest Buckner for a 12 yard touchdown in a 27–24 overtime loss. Two weeks later, Warner recorded 11 tackles, a tackle for loss, and strip-sacked Aaron Rodgers in a 37–8 victory over the Green Bay Packers, earning National Football Conference (NFC) Defensive Player of the Week honors. Warner was named the NFC Defensive Player of the Month for his play in November. During Week 16 against the Rams, Warner recorded 11 tackles and an interception off a pass thrown by Jared Goff, which he returned 46 yards for his first NFL touchdown in a narrow 34–31 victory. During Super Bowl LIV against the Kansas City Chiefs, Warner recorded seven tackles and intercepted a pass thrown by Patrick Mahomes during the 31–20 loss. He was ranked 70th by his peers on the NFL Top 100 Players of 2020.

=== 2020 season ===
On August 31, 2020, Warner was placed on the COVID-19 reserved list by the team, before he was activated on September 9.

In Week 3 against the New York Giants, Warner recorded his first interception of the season during the 36–9 win. In Week 16, Warner racked up 14 tackles, three passes defended, a forced fumble and a fumble recovery in a 20–12 win over the Arizona Cardinals, earning NFC Defensive Player of the Week. In Week 17 against the Seahawks, Warner led the team with 10 tackles and recorded his first sack of the season on Russell Wilson during the 26–23 loss. Warner totaled one sack, 125 total tackles, two interceptions, six passes defended, and one forced fumble in 16 games and starts. The season culminated in Warner earning his first Pro Bowl selection, and first ever honor as Associated Press First-team All-Pro. He was ranked 21st by his fellow players on the NFL Top 100 Players of 2021.

=== 2021 season ===
On July 21, 2021, Warner signed a record-breaking five-year extension with the 49ers worth $95 million along with $40.5 million guaranteed. In the 2021 season, Warner appeared in and started 16 regular season games and three postseason games. He had .5 sacks, 137 total tackles, four passes defended, and one forced fumble. He was ranked 47th by his fellow players on the NFL Top 100 Players of 2022.

=== 2022 season ===
In the 2022 season, Warner started in all 17 regular season games and three postseason games for the 49ers. He had two sacks, 130 total tackles, one interception, ten passes defended, and one forced fumble. He earned Pro Bowl and first team All-Pro honors. He was ranked 15th by his fellow players on the NFL Top 100 Players of 2023.

=== 2023 season ===
In Week 5 of the 2023 season, against the Dallas Cowboys, Warner made a team-leading eight solo tackles, one interception, one forced fumble (on running back Tony Pollard), and a sack on quarterback Dak Prescott. He won NFC Defensive Player of the Week. The 49ers won at home 42–10. He earned Pro Bowl and first team All-Pro honors for the season. In the 2023 season, Warner had 2.5 sacks, 132 total tackles (82 solo), four interceptions, 11 passes defended, and four forced fumbles in 17 games and starts. Warner had a team-leading 13 total tackles in Super Bowl LVIII, a 25–22 loss in overtime to the Chiefs. Warner was ranked 11th by his fellow players on the NFL Top 100 Players of 2024.

=== 2024 season ===
In the 49ers' season debut against the New York Jets, Warner posted 7 overall tackles, as well as a forced fumble which would be recovered by 49ers DL Maliek Collins. With this forced fumble, Warner surpassed former 49ers LB Ahmad Brooks for the second-most forced fumbles in franchise history. In Week 4 against the New England Patriots, Warner returned an interception 45 yards for a touchdown and also became the first player in 49ers franchise history to record 10+ sacks and 10+ interceptions in his career. Warner was ranked 16th by his fellow players on the NFL Top 100 Players of 2025.

=== 2025 season ===
On May 22, 2025, Warner signed a three-year, $63 million contract extension with the 49ers, making him the highest paid linebacker in the NFL.

In Week 2, Warner recorded 11 tackles, one tackle for loss, a forced fumble and recovery in a 26–21 win over the New Orleans Saints, earning NFC Defensive Player of the Week.

In Week 6, in a 19-30 loss to the Tampa Bay Buccaneers, Warner suffered a dislocated and broken ankle, which required him to get season-ending surgery.

=== 2026 season ===
Warner was ranked number 54 on NFL's Top 100 Players list of 2026.

== Career statistics ==
Legend
	Led the league
**Bold**	Career high

=== NFL ===
==== Regular season ====
Year	Team	Games		Tackles						Interceptions						Fumbles	
Year	Team	GP	GS	Cmb	Solo	Ast	Sck	TFL	Sfty	PD	Int	Yds	Avg	Lng	TD	FF	FR
2018	SF	16	16	124	85	39	0.0	3	0	6	0	0	0.0	0	0	1	1
2019	SF	16	16	118	**89**	29	**3.0**	**7**	0	9	1	46	**46.0**	**46T**	**1**	3	0
2020	SF	16	16	125	79	46	1.0	5	0	6	2	3	1.5	3	0	1	2
2021	SF	16	16	**137**	79	**58**	0.5	**7**	0	4	0	0	0.0	0	0	1	**3**
2022	SF	17	17	130	79	51	2.0	3	0	10	1	20	20.0	20	0	1	0
2023	SF	17	17	132	82	50	2.5	6	0	**11**	**4**	66	16.5	32	0	**4**	0
2024	SF	17	17	131	76	55	1.0	5	0	7	2	**70**	35.0	45T	**1**	**4**	0
2025	SF	6	6	51	28	23	0.0	2	0	3	0	0	0	0	0	2	1
2026	SF	5	5	50	21	29	0.5	1	0	3	0	0	0	0	0	3	0
Career		126	126	998	618	380	10.5	39	0	59	10	205	20.2	46T	2	20	7

==== Postseason ====
Year	Team	Games		Tackles						Interceptions						Fumbles	
Year	Team	GP	GS	Cmb	Solo	Ast	Sck	TFL	Sfty	PD	Int	Yds	Avg	Lng	TD	FF	FR
2019	SF	3	3	20	11	**9**	0.0	1	0	**2**	**1**	3	3.0	3	0	0	0
2021	SF	3	3	21	13	8	0.0	**3**	0	1	0	0	0.0	0	0	**1**	0
2022	SF	3	3	23	16	7	0.0	2	0	1	**1**	**16**	**16.0**	**16**	0	0	0
2023	SF	3	3	**33**	**24**	**9**	0.0	2	0	1	0	0	0.0	0	0	0	0
2025	SF	0	0	Did not play due to injury													
Career		12	12	97	64	33	0.0	8	0	5	2	19	9.5	16	0	1	0

=== College ===
Season	Team	GP	Tackles					Interceptions					Fumbles	
Season	Team	GP	Cmb	Solo	Ast	Sck	TFL	Int	Yds	Avg	Lng	TD	FF	FR
2014	BYU	10	24	17	7	0.0	1.0	1	20	20.0	20	**1**	0	0
2015	BYU	13	67	46	21	**4.0**	**11.5**	2	27	13.5	0	0	0	**4**
2016	BYU	13	86	47	**39**	1.5	10.5	**3**	**61**	20.3	0	**1**	**2**	0
2017	BYU	13	**87**	**48**	**39**	1.0	9.0	1	26	**26.0**	**26**	0	0	1
Career		49	264	158	106	6.5	32.0	7	134	20.0	26	2	3	5

== Personal life ==
In December 2017, Warner graduated with a degree in exercise and wellness from BYU.

Warner's younger brother, Troy, followed him to BYU in 2015 as a defensive back.

Warner married former The Bachelor contestant Sydney Hightower on June 25, 2022.

== Community involvement ==
Warner collaborates with Venardi Zurada, a Bay Area law firm, to host events that benefit the community. One example is the annual Thanksgiving Food Drive in Walnut Creek, where fans donate non-perishable items in exchange for a meet-and-greet with Warner. In 2024, this event collected 1,388 pounds of food, providing approximately 1,157 meals for families in need.

Additionally, Warner has participated in mental health awareness initiatives, such as a conversation at Canyon Middle School in Castro Valley, in partnership with CASSY (Counseling and Support Services for Youth). These discussions focus on the importance of mental health, early intervention, and creating supportive environments for youth.

He has partnered with Nike and the Hispanic Scholarship Fund to provide Latino students with scholarships and career readiness programs. Warner also selected the COPD Foundation as his charity for the NFL's "My Cause My Cleats" campaign to raise awareness for chronic obstructive pulmonary disease.

== See also ==
- List of Afro-Latinos
