= Vallecitos Water District =

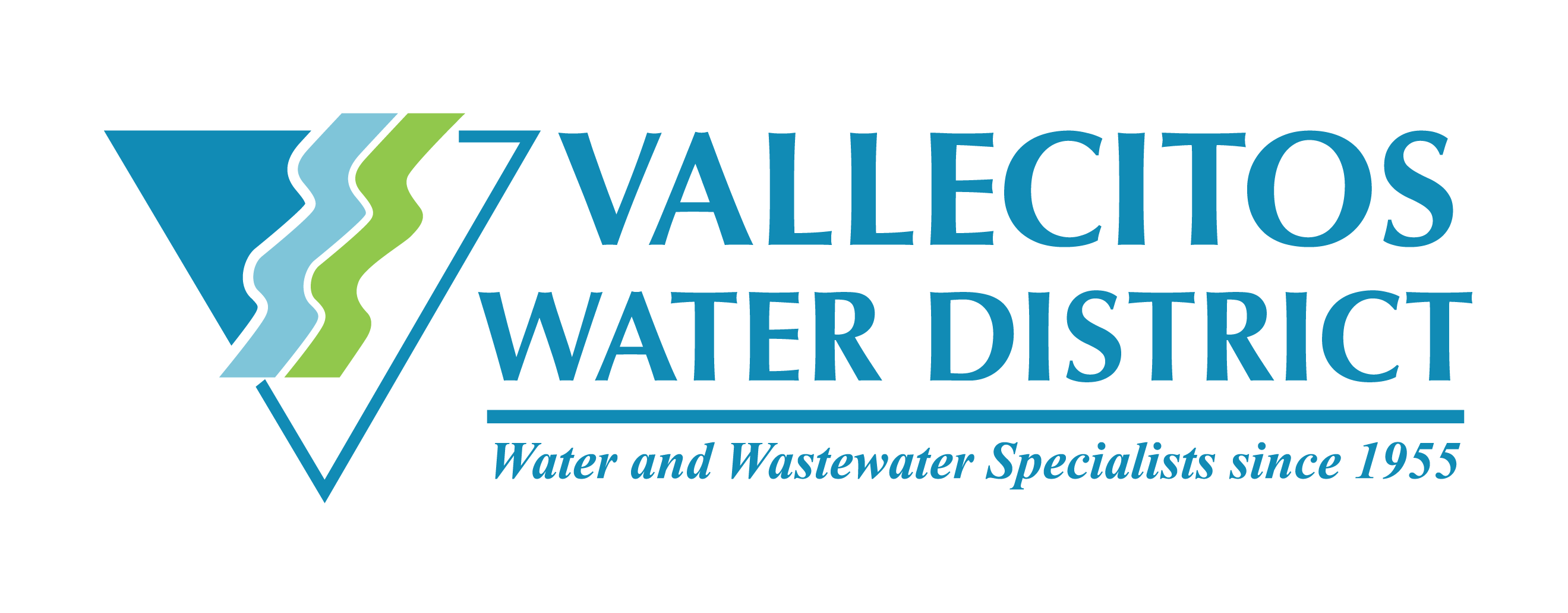
Vallecitos Water District Logo

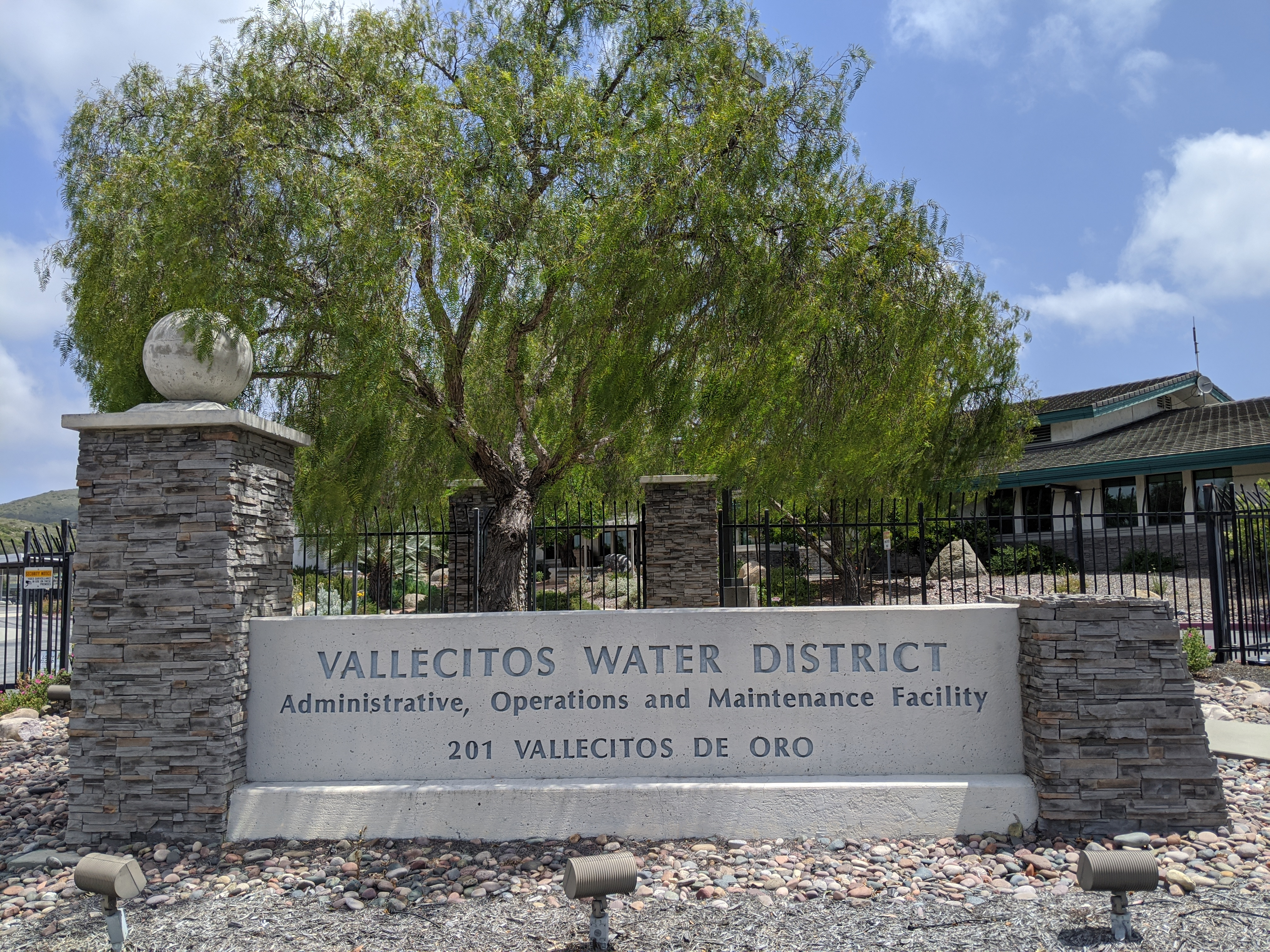
Entrance to the Vallecitos Water District building

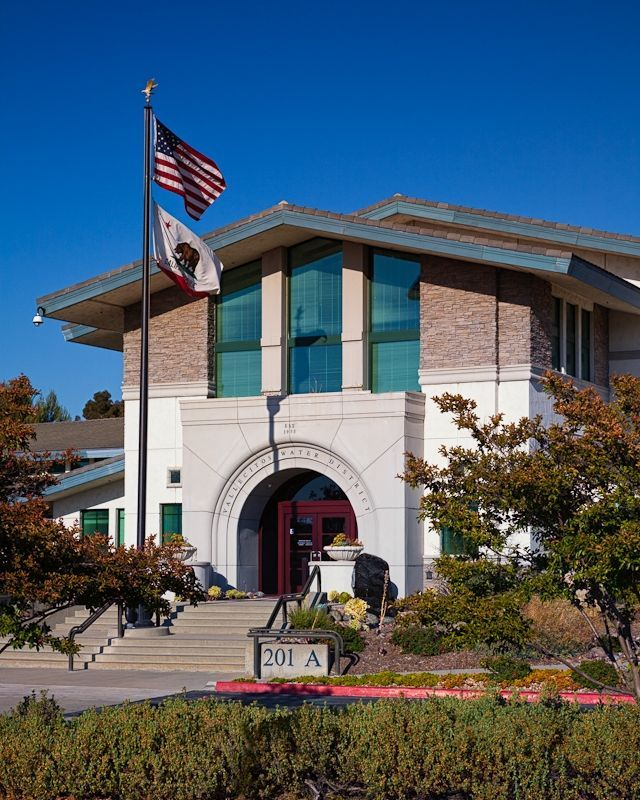
Vallecitos Water District Office and location of Sustainable Demonstration Garden

Vallecitos Water District is a public agency that provides water, wastewater, and reclamation services within a 45-square-mile boundary in northwest San Diego County, California, United States. It serves the City of San Marcos, the community of Lake San Marcos, parts of the City of Carlsbad, City of Escondido, City of Vista and other unincorporated areas in north San Diego County. Public education on water resources is an additional aspect of the Vallecitos Water District.

Vallecitos Water District was founded in 1955 as the San Marcos County Water District and is a member agency of the San Diego County Water Authority.

The Vallecitos Water District receives approximately 27 percent of its annual supply from the Claude "Bud" Lewis Desalination Plant in Carlsbad, California, which delivers as much as 4,083 acre feet of desalinated water annually to Vallecitos’ distribution system.

Desalinated water is now a major component of Vallecitos’ water portfolio, further minimizing the District's reliance on imported water and providing customers an increased level of reliability despite drought and other regulatory issues. Vallecitos is currently one of two water providers that have a direct connection to the Desalination Plant.

== Board of directors ==
Vallecitos Water District is governed by a 5-member Board of Directors. Vallecitos Board of Director meetings are open to the public and are held at the District's administrative offices.

Board of Directors Division Map
