= San Marcos High School (San Marcos, California) =

Location
- 1615 W. San Marcos Blvd; San Marcos, California, 92078; United States; 33°07′50″N 117°12′23″W

Information
- Type: Public
- Motto: "Blue Is Back!"
- Established: 1961
- School district: San Marcos Unified School District
- Principal: Christina Wilde
- Teaching staff: 118.61 (FTE)
- Grades: 9-12
- Enrollment: 3,201 (2023-2024)
- Student to teacher ratio: 26.99
- Campus: Suburban
- Colors: Navy, Columbia blue, Silver
- Mascot: Knight
- Website: sanmarcoshigh.smusd.org

San Marcos High School is a high school in the North County city of San Marcos, California. San Marcos High School is a member of the San Marcos Unified School District and serves students from San Marcos, Vista, and Carlsbad. Out of the 4 high schools in the district, it is the largest by student enrollment, at more than 3,000 in 2021. San Marcos High School also has a joint program with nearby La Costa Canyon High School to serve students in the area.

== Academics ==
San Marcos High School had a graduation rate of 99% for the Class of 2020. The Academic Performance Index was an annual measure of the academic performance and progress of schools in California. API scores ranged from 200-1,000, with a statewide target of 800. San Marcos High School’s last API score was 857.

=== Air Force JROTC ===
San Marcos JROTC is a program run by retired Air Force Lieutenant Colonel Michael Samuel. Founded in 2009, the program was created with the intention to promote values of integrity, service, and excellence among students. Cadets enrolled would experience a multisubject program involving aerospace science, physical training, United States Air Force history, military drills, military dress and appearance, and general life skills over the course of the year.

== Programs ==
=== PACE Promise ===
The PACE Promise, a joint program of San Marcos Unified School District (SMUSD) and California State University San Marcos (CSUSM), guarantees CSUSM admission to all district students continuously enrolled in the district from 9th through 12th grade who meet entrance requirements.

== Notable alumni ==
- Allan Clark (1975), professional football player
- Paloma Young (1996), professional costume designer
- Vincent Briedis (1997), former professional baseball player, current NCAA Division I Football Bowl Subdivision Administrator
- Eddie Sanchez (2000), professional mixed martial artist, former UFC heavyweight
- Chad Ackerman (2001), lead singer for the band Destroy the Runner
- Terrell Burgess (2016), professional football safety, Super Bowl LVI champion
- Andrew Meyer (2018), NFL center for the Miami Dolphins
- Kyle Carr (2020), pitcher in the New York Yankees organization
- Emmett Brown (2022), quarterback for the Coastal Carolina Chanticleers
