= San Marcos Unified School District =

School district in California, United States

Address
- 255 Pico Avenue San Marcos, California; United States

District information
- Type: Public
- Grades: K–12
- Superintendent: Andy Johnsen
- Deputy superintendent(s): Tiffany Campbell
- Chair of the board: Stacy Carlson
- Director of education: Steve Baum
- NCES District ID: 0634880

Students and staff
- Students: 19,767 (2020–2021)
- Teachers: 796.83 (FTE)
- Staff: 1,030.22 (FTE)
- Student–teacher ratio: 24.81:1

Other information
- Website: www.smusd.org

San Marcos Unified School District (SMUSD) is a public school district based in San Marcos, California. It includes 19 schools with educational programs for kindergarten through adult education students. The district serves San Marcos, as well as sections of Vista, Escondido, Carlsbad, and some unincorporated areas of the county. SMUSD is the fifth largest school district in San Diego County, serving over 19,000 students.

== Governing Board ==
The district is governed by a five-member governing board, also known as the school board.

The five current board members include Heidi Herrick, Sarah Ahmad, Andrés Martín, Lena Meum, and Stacy Carlson.

=== Current board members ===
Area	Board Member	Term expires
A	Heidi Herrick	2028
B	Sarah Ahmad (President)	2028
C	Andrés Martín (Vice President)	2026
D	Lena Meum	2028
E	Stacy Carlson	2026

== District office ==
Superintendent

The superintendent of the San Marcos Unified School District is Andy Johnsen, as of July 2021. He previously served as associate superintendent, and later superintendent of the Lakeside Union School District between 2015 and 2021.

Educational Services

Tiffany Campbell is deputy superintendent of schools. She previously served as assistant superintendent of educational services, director of secondary education, and principal of San Marcos High School.

Steve Baum, executive director of educational services, leads the department. He previously served as director of secondary education, and principal of Double Peak School, and Twin Oaks and Knob Hill Elementary Schools. Nicole DiRanna is director of curriculum and instruction.

Business Services

Erin Garcia serves as assistant superintendent of business services.

Human Resources

Joel Garcia, Ed.D. serves as Assistant Superintendent of Human Resources and Development

== Schools ==
=== Adult Education ===
- San Marcos Adult School

=== High schools ===
- Mission Hills High School
- San Marcos High School
- Foothills High School (alternative)
- Twin Oaks High School (alternative)
- juvenile court community school (alternative)

=== Middle schools ===
- San Elijo Middle School
- San Marcos Middle School
- Woodland Park Middle School

=== Elementary schools ===
- Joli Ann Leichtag Elementary School
- La Costa Meadows Elementary School
- Carrillo Elementary School
- Discovery Elementary School
- Paloma Elementary School
- Richland Elementary School
- San Elijo Elementary School
- San Marcos Elementary School
- Twin Oaks Elementary School
- Knob Hill Elementary School

=== K-8 schools ===
- Double Peak School
- La Mirada Academy
