= 2023 Liga 3 West Papua =

Liga 3 Arfak Mountains Regent's Cup

Tournament details
- Country: Indonesia
- Venue: 1
- Dates: 20 November – 4 December 2023
- Teams: 9

Final positions
- Champions: Persegaf (1st title)
- Runners-up: PS Kasuari
- Third place: Raja Ampat United
- Fourth place: Kaimana
- Qualified for: 2023–24 Liga 3 National phase

Tournament statistics
- Matches played: 20
- Goals scored: 82 (4.1 per match)
- Top goal scorer: Jhon Rumbruren (9 goals)

The 2023 Liga 3 West Papua (also called Liga 3 Arfak Mountains Regent's Cup for sponsorship reasons) is the fourth edition organized by Asprov PSSI West Papua.

This competition was attended by 9 teams from Southwest Papua and West Papua. The winner of this competition will advance to the national phase.

Perseman is the defending champion after winning it in the 2021 season. In 2022, the competition will not be held by Asprov PSSI West Papua.

== Teams ==
Liga 3 West Papua this season was attended by 9 teams from 2 provinces. The following is a list of participating teams.

| No. | Team | Location |
|---|---|---|
West Papua
| 1 | Ransiki | South Manokwari |
| 2 | Mata'afa | Manokwari |
| 3 | Mutiara Timur PB | Manokwari |
| 4 | PS Kamasan | Manokwari |
| 5 | PS Kasuari | Manokwari |
| 6 | Persewon | Teluk Wondama |
| 7 | Kaimana | Kaimana |
| 8 | Persegaf | Arfak Mountains |
Southwest Papua
| 9 | Raja Ampat United | Raja Ampat |

== Venue ==
- Sanggeng Stadium, Manokwari Regency

== Group stage ==
All times listed below are East Indonesia Time (WIT).

=== Group A ===
| Pos | Team | Pld | W | D | L | GF | GA | GD | Pts | Qualification |
|---|---|---|---|---|---|---|---|---|---|---|
| 1 | Raja Ampat United | 4 | 3 | 0 | 1 | 13 | 5 | +8 | 9 | Qualified to knockout stage |
| 2 | Persegaf (H) | 4 | 3 | 0 | 1 | 12 | 5 | +7 | 9 | Qualified to knockout stage |
| 3 | PS Kamasan | 4 | 2 | 1 | 1 | 15 | 5 | +10 | 7 | |
| 4 | Mutiara Timur PB | 4 | 1 | 1 | 2 | 6 | 7 | −1 | 4 | |
| 5 | Mata'afa | 4 | 0 | 0 | 4 | 2 | 26 | −24 | 0 | |

Source: Asprov PSSI West Papua
(H) Hosts
20 November 2023
07.30

| Mutiara Timur PB | 2–2 | PS Kamasan |
|---|---|---|
| | Report |

Sanggeng Stadium, Manokwari Regency
20 November 2023
15.00

| Mata'afa | 1–6 | Persegaf |
|---|---|---|
| | Report |

Sanggeng Stadium, Manokwari Regency

22 November 2023
07.30

| Raja Ampat United | 6–0 | Mata'afa |
|---|---|---|
| | Report |

Sanggeng Stadium, Manokwari Regency
22 November 2023
15.00

| Persegaf | 2–0 | Mutiara Timur PB |
|---|---|---|
| | Report |

Sanggeng Stadium, Manokwari Regency

24 November 2023
07.30

| Persegaf | 2–0 | PS Kamasan |
|---|---|---|
| | Report |

Sanggeng Stadium, Manokwari Regency
30 November 2023
15.00

| Raja Ampat United | 3–2 | Mutiara Timur PB |

Sanggeng Stadium, Manokwari Regency

The match which was supposed to be held on 24 November 2023 was postponed and will be played on 30 November 2023.

26 November 2023
15.00

| Mutiara Timur PB | 2–0 | Mata'afa |
|---|---|---|
| | Report |

Sanggeng Stadium, Manokwari Regency
27 November 2023
15.00

| PS Kamasan | 1–0 | Raja Ampat United |
|---|---|---|
| | Report |

Sanggeng Stadium, Manokwari Regency

29 November 2023
07.30

| Raja Ampat United | 4–2 | Persegaf |
|---|---|---|
| | Report |

Sanggeng Stadium, Manokwari Regency
29 November 2023
15.00

| PS Kamasan | 12–1 | Mata'afa |
|---|---|---|
| | Report |

Sanggeng Stadium, Manokwari Regency

=== Group B ===
| Pos | Team | Pld | W | D | L | GF | GA | GD | Pts | Qualification |
|---|---|---|---|---|---|---|---|---|---|---|
| 1 | Kaimana | 3 | 2 | 1 | 0 | 9 | 4 | +5 | 7 | Qualified to knockout stage |
| 2 | PS Kasuari | 3 | 2 | 1 | 0 | 4 | 1 | +3 | 7 | Qualified to knockout stage |
| 3 | Persewon | 3 | 1 | 0 | 2 | 6 | 8 | −2 | 3 | |
| 4 | Ransiki | 3 | 0 | 0 | 3 | 1 | 7 | −6 | 0 | |

Source: Asprov PSSI West Papua
21 November 2023
07.30

| PS Kasuari | 1–0 | Ransiki |
|---|---|---|
| | Report |

Sanggeng Stadium, Manokwari Regency
21 November 2023
15.00

| Kaimana | 5–3 | Persewon |
|---|---|---|
| | Report |

Sanggeng Stadium, Manokwari Regency

23 November 2023
07.30

| Ransiki | 1–3 | Persewon |
|---|---|---|
| | Report |

Sanggeng Stadium, Manokwari Regency
23 November 2023
15.00

| Kaimana | 1–1 | PS Kasuari |
|---|---|---|
| | Report |

Sanggeng Stadium, Manokwari Regency

25 November 2023
07.30

| PS Kasuari | 2–0 | Persewon |
|---|---|---|
| | Report |

Sanggeng Stadium, Manokwari Regency
25 November 2023
15.00

| Ransiki | 0–3 | Kaimana |
|---|---|---|
| | Report |

Sanggeng Stadium, Manokwari Regency

== Knockout stage ==
All times listed below are East Indonesia Time (WIT).

=== Bracket ===
Semi-finals
1 December 2023 – Manokwari
A1 | Raja Ampat United | 1
B2 | PS Kasuari (a.e.t.) | 2
1 December 2023 – Manokwari
B1 | Kaimana | 0
A2 | Persegaf | 5

Final
4 December 2023 – Manokwari
PS Kasuari | 0
Persegaf | 3
Third place play-off
3 December 2023 – Manokwari
Raja Ampat United | 2
Kaimana | 1

=== Semi-finals ===
1 December 2023
07.30

| Raja Ampat United | 1–2 (a.e.t.) | PS Kasuari |
|---|---|---|
| | Report |

Sanggeng Stadium, Manokwari Regency

1 December 2023
15.00

| Kaimana | 0–5 | Persegaf |
|---|---|---|
| | Report |

Sanggeng Stadium, Manokwari Regency

=== Third place play-off ===
3 December 2023
15.00

| Raja Ampat United | 2–1 | Kaimana |
|---|---|---|
| | Report |

Sanggeng Stadium, Manokwari Regency

=== Final ===
4 December 2023
15.00

| PS Kasuari | 0–3 | Persegaf |
|---|---|---|
| | Report |

Sanggeng Stadium, Manokwari Regency

== Qualification to the national phase ==
| Team | Method of qualification | Date of qualification | Qualified to |
|---|---|---|---|
| Persegaf | 2023 Liga 3 West Papua champions | 4 December 2023 | 2023–24 Liga 3 National Phase |

== Awards ==
| Award | Player | Team | Ref. |
|---|---|---|---|
| Top scorer | Jhon Rumbruren (9 goals) | Persegaf | |
| Best player | Maikel Antoh | Raja Ampat United | |
| Best goalkeeper | Mohammad Sanusi | Persegaf | |

== See also ==
- 2023–24 Liga 3 National Phase
- 2023 Liga 3 Papua
