= 2025–26 Liga 4 West Papua =

Liga 4 West Papua
- Season: 2025–26
- Dates: 31 March – 20 April 2026
- Teams: 9
- Champions: Persipegaf
- Runner up: Ransiki
- National phase: Persipegaf
- Matches: 20
- Goals: 59 (2.95 per match)

The 2025–26 Liga 4 West Papua (also known as the 2025–26 Liga 4 West Papua Governor's Cup for sponsorship reasons) is the second season of the fourth-tier football competition in West Papua. The tournament is organized by the Provincial Association of PSSI West Papua and serves as the provincial qualifying round for the national phase of the 2025–26 Liga 4.

The competition was originally scheduled to kick off on 28 March 2026, held at Sanggeng Stadium, Manokwari Regency. However, to ensure optimal implementation, the start of the competition has been postponed to 31 March 2026.

== Background ==
Following the ordinary congress of the Provincial Association of PSSI West Papua in late 2025, the association confirmed the roadmap and competition structure for the 2025–26 Liga 4 season, including the organization of the provincial qualifying round. The 2025–26 Liga 4 West Papua was initially planned to be contested by 18 teams representing 7 regencies across West Papua. A significant number of participating clubs originate from Manokwari and Arfak Mountains regions, highlighting the concentration of football development and participation in these areas.

However, despite the initial registration of 18 teams, only 9 teams ultimately confirmed their readiness to participate in the competition. This reduction affected the final composition of participating teams and the tournament format.

In preparation for the competition, all administrative and technical arrangements have been finalized, including the verification of participating clubs, the group (pool) draw, and overall team readiness. Initially scheduled to kick off on 28 March 2026, the start of the competition was subsequently postponed to 31 March 2026 in order to ensure optimal organization and implementation.

Four new clubs were officially ratified as members of the association: Mata'afa, PS Unipa, Ransiki, and Arfak United. Of these newly admitted clubs, only Ransiki took part in the 2025–26 Liga 4 West Papua, while the remaining clubs did not participate in the competition.

In addition, several regencies organized open player selection programs ahead of the tournament to strengthen their squads. Among them, the Kaimana Regional Football Association (PSSI Kaimana Regency) conducted player trials for Kaimana Football Club as part of its preparation for the competition.

== Teams ==
The 2025–26 Liga 4 West Papua is contested by 9 teams representing 6 regencies across West Papua. The majority of participating clubs originate from Manokwari, Arfak Mountains, Bintuni Bay, Kaimana, Fakfak, and South Manokwari, which remain key centers of football development in the province.

=== Location map ===
Locations of teams competing in the 2025–26 Liga 4 West Papua.
- Manokwari – PS Kasuari, PS Kamasan, Kejaksaan
- Bintuni Bay – Putra Telbin, Persitelbin

=== Participating teams ===
All preparatory stages, including the group (pool) draw and team readiness, have been fully completed. The competition was originally scheduled to kick-off on 28 March 2026; however, to ensure optimal implementation, the start of the competition has been postponed to 31 March 2026.

No	Team	Location	Stadium	2024–25 season
1	Persipegaf	Arfak Mountains	Irai Football Field	champions
2	PS Kasuari	Manokwari	Sanggeng Stadium	group stage
3	Kejaksaan	Manokwari	Sanggeng Stadium	—
4	PS Kamasan	Manokwari	Sanggeng Stadium	—
5	Kaimana	Kaimana	Triton Stadium	group stage
6	Putra Telbin	Bintuni Bay	SP IV Manimeri Field	group stage
7	Persitelbin	Bintuni Bay	SP IV Manimeri Field	—
8	Ransiki	South Manokwari	Ransiki Football Field	—
9	Persifa	Fakfak	16 November Stadium	—

== Venue ==
The main venue of the tournament is expected to be:

- Sanggeng Stadium, Manokwari

== Group stage ==
The group stage is scheduled to begin on 31 March 2026. 9 teams were divided into 2 groups, with Group A consisting of 5 teams and Group B consisting of 4 teams.

=== Group A ===
Pos	Team	Pld	W	D	L	GF	GA	GD	Pts	Qualification
1	Persipegaf	4	3	1	0	8	2	+6	10	Qualification to knockout stage
2	Ransiki	4	2	2	0	8	4	+4	8	Qualification to knockout stage
3	Kejaksaan	4	1	1	2	7	7	0	4	
4	Kaimana	4	1	1	2	5	6	−1	4	
5	Persitelbin	4	0	1	3	3	12	−9	1	

Updated to match(es) played on 10 April 2026. Source: PSSI West Papua
Rules for classification: 1) Points; 2) Head-to-head points; 3) Head-to-head goal difference; 4) Head-to-head goals scored; 5) Goal difference; 6) Goals scored; 7) Fair-play points; 8) Draw.

Matchday 1 (31 March and 6 April 2026)

==== Matchday 1 ====
31 March 2026
15:15 (UTC+09:00)

Persipegaf	1–0	Kejaksaan
	Report

Sanggeng Stadium, Manokwari
6 April 2026
15:15 (UTC+09:00)

Persitelbin	2–2	Kaimana
	Report

Sanggeng Stadium, Manokwari

Matchday 2 (2 April 2026)

==== Matchday 2 ====
2 April 2026
07:30 (UTC+09:00)

Ransiki	3–0 (w/o)	Persitelbin
	Report

Sanggeng Stadium, Manokwari

Persitelbin was declared to have lost 3–0 to Ransiki due to their absence (walkover) from the scheduled match.

2 April 2026
15:15 (UTC+09:00)

Kaimana	0–2	Persipegaf
	Report

Sanggeng Stadium, Manokwari

Matchday 3 (8 April 2026)

==== Matchday 3 ====
8 April 2026
07:30 (UTC+09:00)

Kaimana	3–1	Kejaksaan
	Report

Sanggeng Stadium, Manokwari
8 April 2026
15:15 (UTC+09:00)

Ransiki	2–2	Persipegaf
	Report

Sanggeng Stadium, Manokwari

Matchday 4 (10 April 2026)

==== Matchday 4 ====
10 April 2026
07:30 (UTC+09:00)

Persipegaf	3–0	Persitelbin
	Report

Sanggeng Stadium, Manokwari
10 April 2026
15:15 (UTC+09:00)

Kejaksaan	2–2	Ransiki
	Report

Sanggeng Stadium, Manokwari

Matchday 5 (12–13 April 2026)

==== Matchday 5 ====
12 April 2026
15:15 (UTC+09:00)

Kejaksaan	4–1	Persitelbin
	Report

Sanggeng Stadium, Manokwari
13 April 2026
08:00 (UTC+09:00)

Ransiki	1–0	Kaimana
	Report

Sanggeng Stadium, Manokwari

=== Group B ===
Pos	Team	Pld	W	D	L	GF	GA	GD	Pts	Qualification
1	Putra Telbin	3	2	1	0	6	4	+2	7	Qualification to knockout stage
2	PS Kamasan	3	1	2	0	5	3	+2	5	Qualification to knockout stage
3	PS Kasuari	3	1	1	1	4	3	+1	4	
4	Persifa	3	0	0	3	3	8	−5	0	

Source: PSSI West Papua
Rules for classification: 1) Points; 2) Head-to-head points; 3) Head-to-head goal difference; 4) Head-to-head goals scored; 5) Goal difference; 6) Goals scored; 7) Fair-play points; 8) Draw.

Matchday 1 (1 April 2026)

==== Matchday 1 ====
1 April 2026
07:30 (UTC+09:00)

PS Kasuari	0–0	PS Kamasan
	Report

Sanggeng Stadium, Manokwari
1 April 2026
15:15 (UTC+09:00)

Putra Telbin	2–1	Persifa
	Report

Sanggeng Stadium, Manokwari

Matchday 2 (7 and 9 April 2026)

==== Matchday 2 ====
7 April 2026
07:30 (UTC+09:00)

PS Kamasan	1–1	Putra Telbin
	Report

Sanggeng Stadium, Manokwari
9 April 2026
15:15 (UTC+09:00)

Persifa	0–2	PS Kasuari
	Report

Sanggeng Stadium, Manokwari

Matchday 3 (11 April 2026)

==== Matchday 3 ====
11 April 2026
07:30 (UTC+09:00)

Putra Telbin	3–2	PS Kasuari
	Report

Sanggeng Stadium, Manokwari
11 April 2026
15:15 (UTC+09:00)

PS Kamasan	4–2	Persifa
	Report

Sanggeng Stadium, Manokwari

== Knockout stage ==
The knockout stage uses a single-match system. In the event of a draw during regulation time, the match proceeds to extra time and, if necessary, a penalty shoot-out to determine the winner. The knockout stage is held from 16 to 20 April 2026 at the Sanggeng Stadium, Manokwari. Four teams from the group stage qualify for this round.

=== Bracket ===
Semi-finals
16 April 2026 — Sanggeng Stadium, Manokwari
A1	Persipegaf	2
B2	PS Kamasan	1
17 April 2026 — Sanggeng Stadium, Manokwari
B1	Putra Telbin	0
A2	Ransiki	2

Final
20 April 2026 — Sanggeng Stadium, Manokwari
Persipegaf	2
Ransiki	0
Third-place play-off
18 April 2026 — Sanggeng Stadium, Manokwari
PS Kamasan	3
Putra Telbin	0

=== Knockout matches ===
Semi-finals (16–17 April 2026)

==== Semi-final 1 ====
16 April 2026
14:20 WIT (UTC+9)

Persipegaf	2–1	PS Kamasan
	Report

Sanggeng Stadium, Manokwari

==== Semi-final 2 ====
17 April 2026
14:20 WIT (UTC+9)

Putra Telbin	0–2	Ransiki
	Report

Sanggeng Stadium, Manokwari

3rd place and Final (18 and 20 April 2026)

==== Third-place play-off ====
18 April 2026
14:20 WIT (UTC+9)

PS Kamasan	3–0	Putra Telbin
	Report

Sanggeng Stadium, Manokwari

==== Final ====
20 April 2026
15:00 WIT (UTC+9)

Persipegaf	2–0	Ransiki
	Report

Sanggeng Stadium, Manokwari

== See also ==
- 2025–26 Liga 4
- 2025–26 Liga 4 Central Papua
- 2025–26 Liga 4 Highland Papua
- 2025–26 Liga 4 South Papua
- 2025–26 Liga 4 Southwest Papua
- 2025–26 Liga 4 Papua
