= Raja Ampat United F.C. =

Indonesian football club

Raja Ampat United
- Full name: Raja Ampat United
- Nickname: Tim Pulau Raja (King Island Team)
- Founded: 2023; 3 years ago
- Ground: Klanafat Stadium; Waisai, Southwest Papua
- Capacity: 5,000
- Owner: PSSI Raja Ampat Regency
- Manager: Rahmat Syam
- Coach: Yos Yoppi Rayar
- League: Liga 4
- 2023: 3rd, (West Papua zone)
Home colours	Away colours

Raja Ampat United Football Club (commonly known as Raja Ampat United) is an Indonesian football club located in Raja Ampat Regency, Southwest Papua. The team competes in Liga 4 Zona Papua Barat.

== Honours ==
- Liga 3 Papua Barat
  - Third-place (1): 2023
- U15 Soeratin Cup West Papua
  - Runner-up (1): 2023
