= Persewon Wondama Bay =

Indonesian football club

Persewon
- Full name: Persatuan Sepakbola Wondama
- Nicknames: Lumba-Lumba Pesisir (The Bay Dolphin); The Black Cyan
- Founded: 2007; 19 years ago
- Ground: Sanggeng Stadium; Manokwari, West Papua
- Capacity: 10,000
- Owner: PSSI Teluk Wondama
- Chairman: Alberth Torey
- Manager: Agus Yulianto
- Coach: Semuel Kandami
- League: Liga 4
- 2023: 3rd in Group B, (Liga 3 West Papua zone)
Home colours	Away colours

Persatuan Sepakbola Wondama, commonly known as Persewon, is an Indonesian football club based in Wondama Bay Regency, West Papua. They currently compete in the Liga 4 West Papua zone.

== Supporter ==
Wondamania is supporter of Persewon.

== Rivalries ==
Persewon has a local rivalry with a football club from the neighboring region, namely Persitelbin Bintuni Bay. Their matches are often referred to as the Gulf derby (Indonesian: Derbi Teluk).
