= List of incumbent regional heads and deputy regional heads in Central Papua =

The following is an article about the list of Regional Heads and Deputy Regional Heads in 8 regencies/cities in Central Papua who are currently still serving.

== List ==
| Regency/ City | Photo of the Regent/ Mayor | Regent/ Mayor | Photo of Deputy Regent/ Mayor | Deputy Regent/ Mayor | Taking Office | End of Office (Planned) | Ref. |
|---|---|---|---|---|---|---|---|
| Deiyai; Regency List of Regents/Deputy Regents | | Melkianus Mote | | Ayub Pigome | 20 February 2025 | 20 February 2030 | |
| Dogiyai; Regency List of Regents/Deputy Regents | | Yudas Tebai | | Yuliten Anouw | 20 February 2025 | 20 February 2030 | |
| Intan Jaya; Regency List of Regents/Deputy Regents | | Aner Maisini | | Elias Igapa | 20 February 2025 | 20 February 2030 | |
| Mimika; Regency List of Regents/Deputy Regents | | Johannes Rettob | | Emanuel Kemong | 25 March 2025 | 25 March 2030 | |
| Nabire; Regency List of Regents/Deputy Regents | | Mesak Magai | | Burhanuddin Pawennari | 20 February 2025 | 20 February 2030 | |
| Paniai; Regency List of Regents/Deputy Regents | | Yampit Nawipa | | Ham Yogi | 20 February 2025 | 20 February 2030 | |
| Puncak; Regency List of Regents/Deputy Regents | | Elvis Tabuni | | Naftali Akawal | 25 March 2025 | 25 March 2030 | |
| Puncak Jaya; Regency List of Regents/Deputy Regents | | Yuni Wonda | | Mus Kogoya | 17 June 2025 | 17 June 2030 | |

Notes

- "Commencement of office" is the inauguration date at the beginning or during the current term of office. For acting regents/mayors, it is the date of appointment or extension as acting regent/mayor.
- Based on the Constitutional Court decision Number 27/PUU-XXII/2024, the Governor and Deputy Governor, Regent and Deputy Regent, and Mayor and Deputy Mayor elected in 2020 shall serve until the inauguration of the Governor and Deputy Governor, Regent and Deputy Regent, and Mayor and Deputy Mayor elected in the 2024 national simultaneous elections as long as the term of office does not exceed 5 (five) years.

== See also ==
- Central Papua
