= Masni =

District in West Papua, Indonesia

- District
- Interactive map of Masni
- Coordinates: 0.793283°S 133.727023°E
- Country: Indonesia
- Province: West Papua
- Regency: Manokwari

Area
  - Total: 406.05 km^{2} (156.78 sq mi)

Population (2022)
  - Total: 17.965
  - Density: 0.044243/km^{2} (0.11459/sq mi)
- Time zone: UTC+9 (WIT)
- Postal Code: 98318

Masni is an administrative district in Manokwari Regency, West Papua, Indonesia.
