= Umnum =

- Location in West Papua and Indonesia Umnum (Indonesia)
- Coordinates: 1°10′37.488″S 133°59′21.948″E
- Country: Indonesia
- Province: West Papua
- Regency: Manokwari Regency
- District: Tanah Rubuh District
- Elevation: 8,986 ft (2,739 m)

Population (2010)
  - Total: 152
- Time zone: UTC+9 (Indonesia Eastern Standard Time)

Umnum is a village in Tanah Rubuh district, Manokwari Regency in West Papua province, Indonesia. Its population is 152.

== Climate ==
Umnum has a cold subtropical highland climate (Cfb) with heavy rainfall year-round.

Climate data for Umnum
| Month | Jan | Feb | Mar | Apr | May | Jun | Jul | Aug | Sep | Oct | Nov | Dec | Year |
|---|---|---|---|---|---|---|---|---|---|---|---|---|---|
| Mean daily maximum °C (°F) | 18.5 (65.3) | 18.5 (65.3) | 18.0 (64.4) | 17.4 (63.3) | 16.5 (61.7) | 15.6 (60.1) | 14.7 (58.5) | 14.7 (58.5) | 16.0 (60.8) | 17.8 (64.0) | 18.3 (64.9) | 18.6 (65.5) | 17.1 (62.7) |
| Daily mean °C (°F) | 13.6 (56.5) | 13.8 (56.8) | 13.7 (56.7) | 13.3 (55.9) | 12.9 (55.2) | 12.4 (54.3) | 11.8 (53.2) | 11.6 (52.9) | 12.3 (54.1) | 13.3 (55.9) | 13.4 (56.1) | 13.8 (56.8) | 13.0 (55.4) |
| Mean daily minimum °C (°F) | 8.8 (47.8) | 9.1 (48.4) | 9.4 (48.9) | 9.3 (48.7) | 9.4 (48.9) | 9.3 (48.7) | 9.0 (48.2) | 8.6 (47.5) | 8.6 (47.5) | 8.8 (47.8) | 8.6 (47.5) | 9.0 (48.2) | 9.0 (48.2) |
| Average precipitation mm (inches) | 288 (11.3) | 305 (12.0) | 273 (10.7) | 300 (11.8) | 325 (12.8) | 307 (12.1) | 297 (11.7) | 282 (11.1) | 264 (10.4) | 246 (9.7) | 249 (9.8) | 285 (11.2) | 3,421 (134.6) |
Source: Climate-Data.org
