= Persegaf Arfak Mountains =

Indonesian football club

Persegaf
- Full name: Persatuan Sepakbola Pegunungan Arfak
- Nickname: Laskar Negeri Di Atas Awan
- Founded: 2019; 7 years ago
- Ground: Irai Field; Arfak Mountains, West Papua
- Owner: Askab PSSI Pegunungan Arfak
- Chairman: Ananias Dowansiba
- Manager: Arifin Askha
- Coach: Viktor Auri
- League: Liga 4
- 2024–25: 3rd, Group A (West Papua zone)
Home colours	Away colours

Persatuan Sepakbola Pegunungan Arfak, simply known as Persegaf, is an Indonesian football club based in Arfak Mountains, West Papua that competes in Liga 4 and play their home match at Irai Field.

== History ==
Persegaf was officially formed in 2019. Representing Arfak Mountains Regency, but Persegaf chose Manokwari as the training camp location because of the lack of sports facilities in the Arfak Mountains.

At the 2023 Liga 3 West Papua, Persegaf was chosen to host the competition. Persegaf again chose Manokwari as the venue for the competition.

== Honours ==
- Liga 3 West Papua
  - Champion (1): 2023
