= Joshua Isir =

Indonesian footballer

Personal information
- Full name: Juscak Joshua Marthen Isir
- Date of birth: 13 June 2001 (age 25)
- Place of birth: Jayapura, Indonesia
- Height: 1.63 m (5 ft 4 in)
- Position: Winger

Team information
- Current team: Persipani Paniai
- Number: 20

Youth career
- 2018: Persipura Jayapura
- 2019–2020: PPLP Papua

Senior career*
Years	Team	Apps	(Gls)
2021–2023	Persipura Jayapura	17	(0)
2023–2024	Persewar Waropen	16	(3)
2025	Persipal Palu	6	(0)
2025	Persipura Jayapura	1	(0)
2026	Persipal Palu	5	(0)
2026–	Persipani Paniai	1	(0)
- * Club domestic league appearances and goals as of 14 November 2026

Juscak Joshua Marthen Isir (born 13 June 2001) is an Indonesian professional footballer who plays as a winger for Liga Nusantara club Persipani Paniai.

== Club career ==
=== Persipura Jayapura ===
He was signed for Persipura Jayapura to play in Liga 1 in the 2021 season. Isir made his first-team debut on 28 August 2021 as a substitute in a match against Persita Tangerang at the Pakansari Stadium, Cibinong.

== Career statistics ==
=== Club ===
As of 14 November 2026

Club	Season	League			Cup		Other		Total	
Club	Season	Division	Apps	Goals	Apps	Goals	Apps	Goals	Apps	Goals
Persipura Jayapura	2021	Liga 1	14	0	0	0	0	0	14	0
Persipura Jayapura	2022	Liga 2	3	0	0	0	0	0	3	0
Persewar Waropen	2023–24	Liga 2	10	2	0	0	0	0	10	2
Persewar Waropen	2024–25	Liga 2	6	1	0	0	0	0	6	1
Persipal Palu	2024–25	Liga 2	6	0	0	0	0	0	6	0
Persipura Jayapura	2025–26	Championship	1	0	0	0	0	0	1	0
Persipal Palu	2025–26	Championship	5	0	0	0	0	0	5	0
Persipani Paniai	2026–27	Liga Nusantara	1	0	0	0	0	0	1	0
Career total			46	3	0	0	0	0	46	3
