= Supnin =

District in Southwest Papua, Indonesia

- District
- Interactive map of Supnin
- Coordinates: 0°3′32.9629″S 130°44′28.4683″E
- Country: Indonesia
- Province: Southwest Papua
- Regency: Raja Ampat Regency
- District seat: Rauki

Area
  - Total: 223.82 km^{2} (86.42 sq mi)
- Time zone: UTC+9 (WIT)
- Postal Code: 98463
- Villages: 4

Supnin is a district in Raja Ampat Regency, Southwest Papua Province, Indonesia.

== Geography ==
Supnin consists of four villages, namely:

- Duber
- Kapadiri
- Rauki
- Urai
