= Adolf Kabo =

Indonesian footballer (1960–2021)

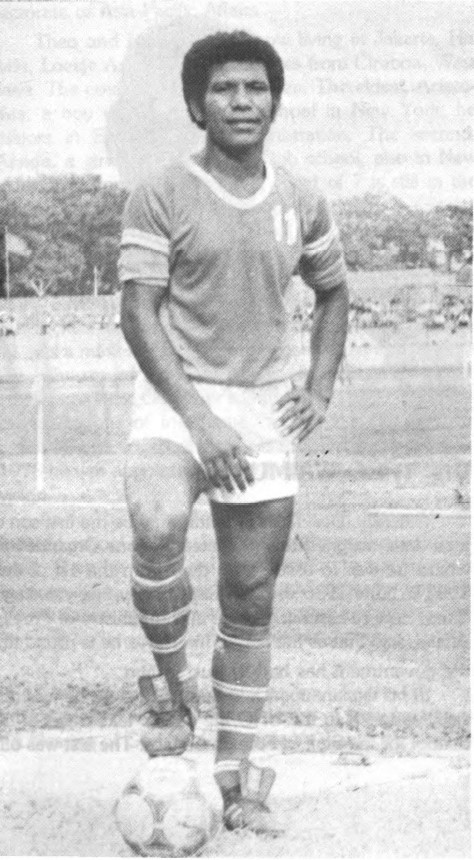
- Kabo in 1987

Personal information
- Date of birth: 3 March 1960
- Place of birth: Manokwari, Indonesia
- Date of death: 4 April 2021 (aged 61)
- Place of death: Manokwari, Indonesia
- Position: Forward

Senior career*
Years	Team	Apps	(Gls)
1983–1988	Perseman Manokwari		

International career
- Indonesia
- * Club domestic league appearances and goals

Adolf Kabo (3 March 1960 – 4 April 2021) was an Indonesian footballer who played for the Indonesia national team.

== Career ==
Born in 1960, in Manokwari, Indonesia, Kabo played for hometown club Perseman Manokwari between 1983 and 1988. As a result of his performances with Perseman Manokwari, Kabo received a call up from the Indonesia national team to play at the 1985 Brunei Merdeka Games. A year later, on 21 September 1986, Kabo scored in a 1–1 draw with Qatar at the 1986 Asian Games in South Korea.
