= PS Kamasan =

Indonesian football club

- Full name: Persatuan Sepakbola Kamasan
- Nicknames: Mutiara Teluk Doreri; Ayam Jago dari Timur
- Founded: 1986; 40 years ago
- Ground: Sanggeng Stadium, Manokwari
- Capacity: 10,000
- Owner: PSSI Manokwari Regency
- Coach: Gerson I. Parerombe
- League: Liga 4
- 2023: 3rd in Group A, (Liga 3 West Papua zone)
Home colours	Away colours

Persatuan Sepakbola Kamasan, commonly known as PS Kamasan, is an Indonesian football club based in Manokwari, West Papua. They play in the Liga 4 West Papua zone. Their home stadium is Sanggeng Stadium.

== Honours ==
- Liga 3 West Papua
  - Runners-up (1): 2021

== Players ==
As of 21 December 2021

Note: Flags indicate national team as defined under FIFA eligibility rules; some limited exceptions apply. Players may hold more than one non-FIFA nationality.

No.	Pos.	Nation	Player
30	GK	IDN	Olipas Marani
2	DF	IDN	Yulianus Woria
4	DF	IDN	Steven Waransano
6	DF	IDN	Bertus Burwos
5	DF	IDN	Maurids Wambrauw
16	MF	IDN	Jannerz Sawor
8	MF	IDN	Arnold Boseren
3	MF	IDN	Ishak Wamafma
10	MF	IDN	Hamdani

No.	Pos.	Nation	Player
14	FW	IDN	Maikel Warme
3	FW	IDN	Kumeser Mapahai (captain)
20	GK	IDN	Theopilus Wanenda
15	DF	IDN	Jefri Awom
19	MF	IDN	Hendrik Seum
17	FW	IDN	Yabes Rumbewas
21	FW	IDN	Gabriel Manupapami
11	FW	IDN	Fredik Okoka
—		IDN	Migel Sernay
—		IDN	Isak Warnay
