= Perseman Manokwari =

Indonesian football club

- Full name: Persatuan Sepakbola Manokwari
- Nickname: Hino Cofu (The White Snake)
- Founded: 1950; 76 years ago
- Ground: Sanggeng Stadium, Manokwari
- Capacity: 15,000
- Owner: Manokwari Regency Government
- Chairman: Drs. Dominggus Mandacan
- Manager: Aristoteles Wamafma
- League: Liga 4
- 2021–22: Liga 3, Round of 64 (National)
| Home colours | Away colours |

Perseman stands for Persatuan Sepakbola Manokwari. Perseman Manokwari is an Indonesian football club based in Manokwari, West Papua. They play in the Liga 4. Their home stadium is Sanggeng Stadium.

== History ==
Perseman Manokwari was established in 1950, is the oldest club from Papua, even standing earlier than Persipura Jayapura which was founded in 1963, starting their work in the competition in the Perserikatan era in 1985, they made it into the top six the first time they participated in the competition.

Under coach Paul Cumming, in 1986, they made it into the final round of the Perserikatan era, however, on October 6, 1986, the final match against Persib Bandung which was held at the Gelora Bung Karno Stadium, Perseman lost to Persib with a score of 6-0 . Despite failing to win the title, Perseman Manokwari remained one of the most frightening clubs until the 1987 season. In the 1988 season, Perseman Manokwari was relegated to Liga Indonesia First Division.

In the era of the 1980s, Perseman Manokwari gave rise to several reliable footballers who almost became champions in the United era, such as Adolf Kabo, Wellem Mara, Yunias Muray, Piet Hein Suabey, Yohanes Kambuaya, Mundus Waney, Aris Kapissa and the Woof brothers, Yulius, Markus, and Mathias.

They are comeback appeared in the highest caste of Indonesian football in the 2007 season. In the previous season they competed in Liga Indonesia First Division and were successfully promoted to Divisi Utama. In their inaugural season in Divisi Utama, Perseman was only able to end the season in 17th place in the eastern group, this made them fail to play in the Indonesia Super League, after a change in the competition format in the 2008–09 season, Perseman continued to compete in Divisi Utama, but at that time Divisi Utama became the second caste in Indonesian football pyramid, from the 2008 season to the 2013 season, Perseman Manokwari was only able to finish in the middle of the standings and always failed to reach the next round. In the 2014 season, they were at the bottom of Group 5 of Divisi Utama making them relegated to Liga 3, Until 2021, Perseman Manokwari is still competing in Liga 3.

== Season-by-season records ==
| Season | League/Division | Tms. | Pos. | Piala Indonesia |
|---|---|---|---|---|
| 2001 | First Division | 23 | 4th, Second round | – |
| 2002 | First Division | 27 | First round | – |
| 2003 | First Division | 26 | 3rd, Group D | – |
| 2004 | First Division | 24 | 12th, East division | – |
| 2005 | First Division | 27 | 6th, Group 3 | First round |
| 2006 | First Division | 36 | 3rd, Second round | First round |
| 2007–08 | Premier Division | 36 | 17th, East division | Round of 16 |
| 2008–09 | Premier Division | 29 | 7th, East division | – |
| 2009–10 | Premier Division | 33 | 6th, Group 3 | – |
| 2010–11 | Premier Division | 39 | 4th, Group 2 | – |
| 2011–12 | Premier Division (LPIS) | 28 | 3 | Round of 16 |
| 2013 | Indonesian Premier League | 16 | 3rd, Play-off round | – |
| 2014 | Premier Division | 63 | 7th, Group 5 | – |
| 2015 | Liga Nusantara | season abandoned | | – |
| 2016 | | | | |
2017
2018
2019
2020
| 2021–22 | Liga 3 | 64 | First round | – |

== Honours ==
- Perserikatan
  - Runner-up (1): 1986
- Liga 3 West Papua
  - Champions (1): 2021
- Liga 3 National
  - Round of 64 (1) 2021 Group A

== Sponsors ==
- Papua TV
- Norayaki I&J

== Kit sponsors ==
- Veldome Sport (2000–2005)
- Warriors (2009–2012)
- Jook Sport (2012–2014)
