= Thomas Forrest (navigator) =

18th-century British navigator

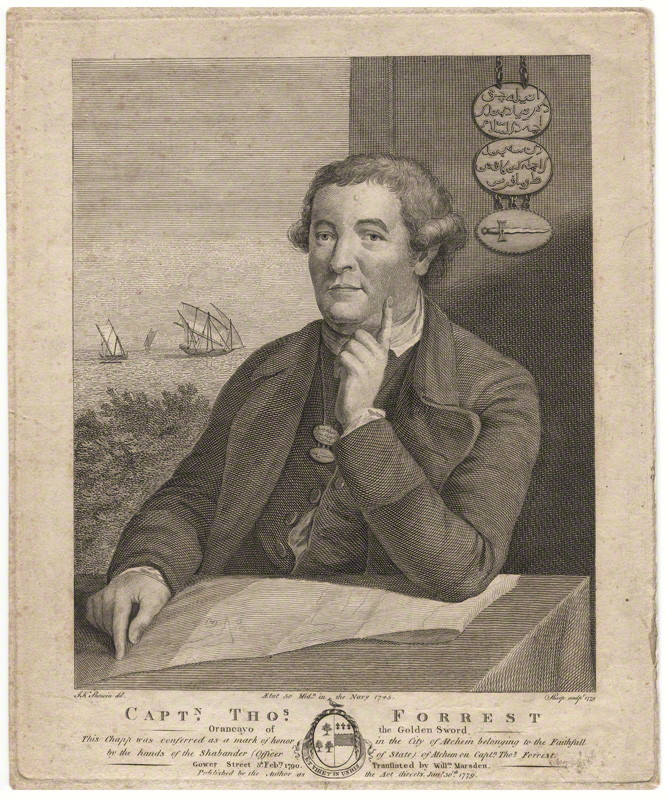
- Thomas Forrest (1779)
- Born: c. 1729
- Died: c. 1802; India
- Occupations: Navigator and explorer

Thomas Forrest (c. 1729 – c. 1802) was a British navigator who served in the East India Company for more than 30 years. He is known for exploration, surveying, and diplomacy, and published three important accounts of his voyages in India and the Malay Archipelago.

== Life ==
He appears to have served for some time in the Royal Navy, and to have been a midshipman in 1745. Passages in his own writings show that he was active in the Malay Archipelago from at least 1753. The date of his employment by the Marine of the East India Company is not clear, but in 1757 he was master of the company's sloop Neptune, which left Madras for Bencoolen on 14 August. The ship capsized and sank with the loss of most of its crew. Forrest and two others were rescued. He was next in command of the sloop Fanny trading in arrack and wine in Batavia in 1759, but fell foul of the Dutch who confiscated most of his cargo and damaged the ship.

Forrest then became a "freighter" or private merchant, trading in opium. He was caught up in the Seven Years' War between France and Britain and was off Fort Marlborough when it capitulated to the French on 3 April 1760. He was released by the French as a private merchant, returned to Batavia to continue trading in opium, and his profits were sufficient for him to purchase the ketch Bonetta. She sailed from northern Sumatra to Bali in early 1762, but was then wrecked near Saleyer He was assisted by the Dutch, who returned him and other survivors to Fort Marlborough in August 1762. Records for the next 10 years are sparse. Forrest and his crew sailed the Company Ketch Nancy to India for repairs, arriving in Vizagapatam in early 1763. Forrest presumably resumed his position in the company's Marine. He commanded Company ships on two trading voyages to Bencoolen, in Syren in 1763 and Diligent in 1765. He must then have left the company's service, because on 17 January 1770 he was re-instated in the company's Marine at Fort Marlborough. Forrest was at that time in England and sailed from Gravesend to Madras with his wife Esther. In 1771 Forrest took command of the Company ship Luconia and was engaged in transporting officials and trade goods. In 1772, he transferred to the Britannia, which was carrying John Herbert (1723–1799) to Balambangan where he was to become governor of a new trading settlement.

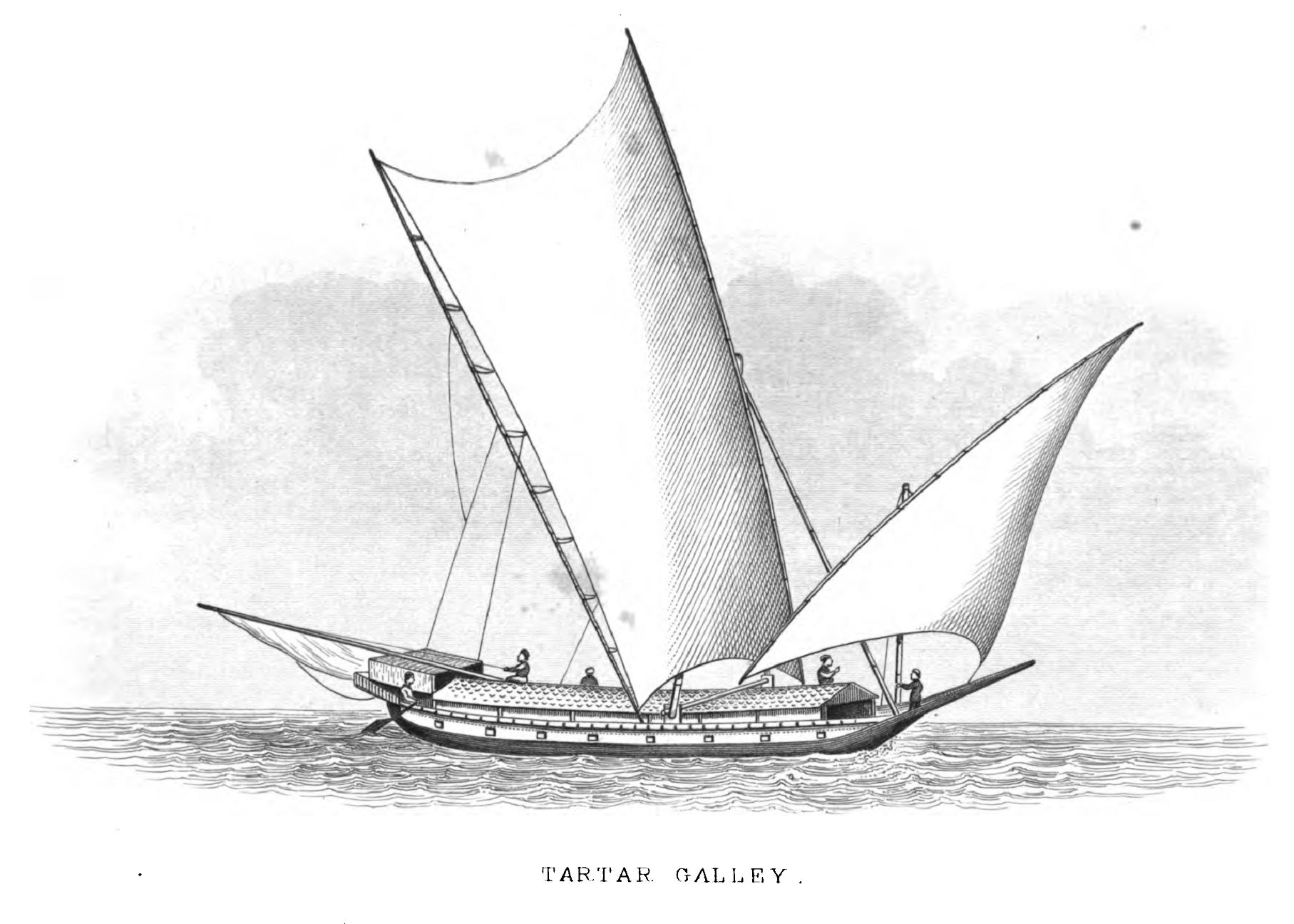
1863 illustration of the Tartar, a garay from Sulu commissioned by Forrest in his 1774-6 expedition to New Guinea

From 1774 to 1776 he led an exploring mission in the direction of New Guinea to locate potential sources of spices, and to carry out survey work. He sailed on 9 November in the Tartar, a garay boat from Sulu of about ten tons burden, with two English officers and a crew of eighteen Malays. In this, accompanied during part of the time by two small boats, he pushed his explorations as far as Geelvink Bay in New Guinea, examining the Sulu Archipelago, the south coast of Mindanao, Mandiolo, Batchian, and particularly Waigeo, of which his was the first good chart. Forrest reached Dorei Harbour and returned to Achin (present-day Aceh) in March 1776. He then returned to London, arriving in early 1777, in order to give an account of his voyage to the directors of the company. They gave permission for publication of a book which appeared in 1779 entitled A Voyage to New Guinea, and the Moluccas, from Balambangan. The book brought him some fame in scientific circles, and he was able to introduce William Marsden, first Secretary to the Admiralty, to Joseph Banks, president of the Royal Society, in 1780.

In 1780, Forrest took command of the Company brig Lively, leaving Gravesend on 26 September. He took with him an Arnold chronometer for determining longitudes in India. He arrived in Madras on 27 March 1781, and was immediately engaged in supporting Britain in the war with France, both transporting people and material and in diplomatic and intelligence activity. In 1782, in the ketch Fly, he located the French fleet, which had left the coast of India and had eluded Sir Edward Hughes the English commander-in-chief, at Aceh. He was able to bring the information to Vizagapatam, which he reached on 20 December, and this saved a number of ships from capture by the French.

In the following June, 1783, Forrest set sail from Calcutta in the brig Esther to survey the Andaman Islands. However, he was blown to the east of them, passing through the Preparis Channel to the Tenassegim coast, which he examined southwards as far as Quedah. In 1790 he made a more thorough examination of the same coast and of the Mergui Archipelago, which forms a long row north to south, with a 125-mile-long sheltered passage between them and the mainland. He christened that stretch Forrest Strait, by which name it is still known. The log of the first voyage was published in 1783, entitled A journal of the Esther brig. The second voyage was published in 1792 as A Voyage from Calcutta to the Mergui Archipelago. This volume was dedicated to William Aldersey, president of the board of trade in Bengal, who was described as Forrest's cousin.

Forrest is said to have died in India about 1802, though Bassett suggests it may have been 1804.

== Charts ==
Forrest constructed the following charts:

- Track chart of the Tartar's voyage
- Malaleo and Gag harbours
- W. Part of Batchian and Mandioli Islands with Bissory harbour
- Selang, Piapia, Offak harbours
- Island of Waygiou, Rawak harbour
- Efbe harbour of Mysole island
- Leron harbour
- Bass harbour, Pera river
- Islands between Sulu and Basilan
- S.W. part of Mindanao
- Bunwoot (Bongo) island
- Leno and Ubal harbours
- Kamaladau (Dumanquilas) Bay
- N.E. Coast of Borneo
- N.W. Coast of Borneo
- Siddo harbour near Acheen
- Part of the Mergui islands
- Pera River, Pulo Dingding and the Sambelong Islands
- Keyser's Bay or Semanko on the South Coast of Sumatra
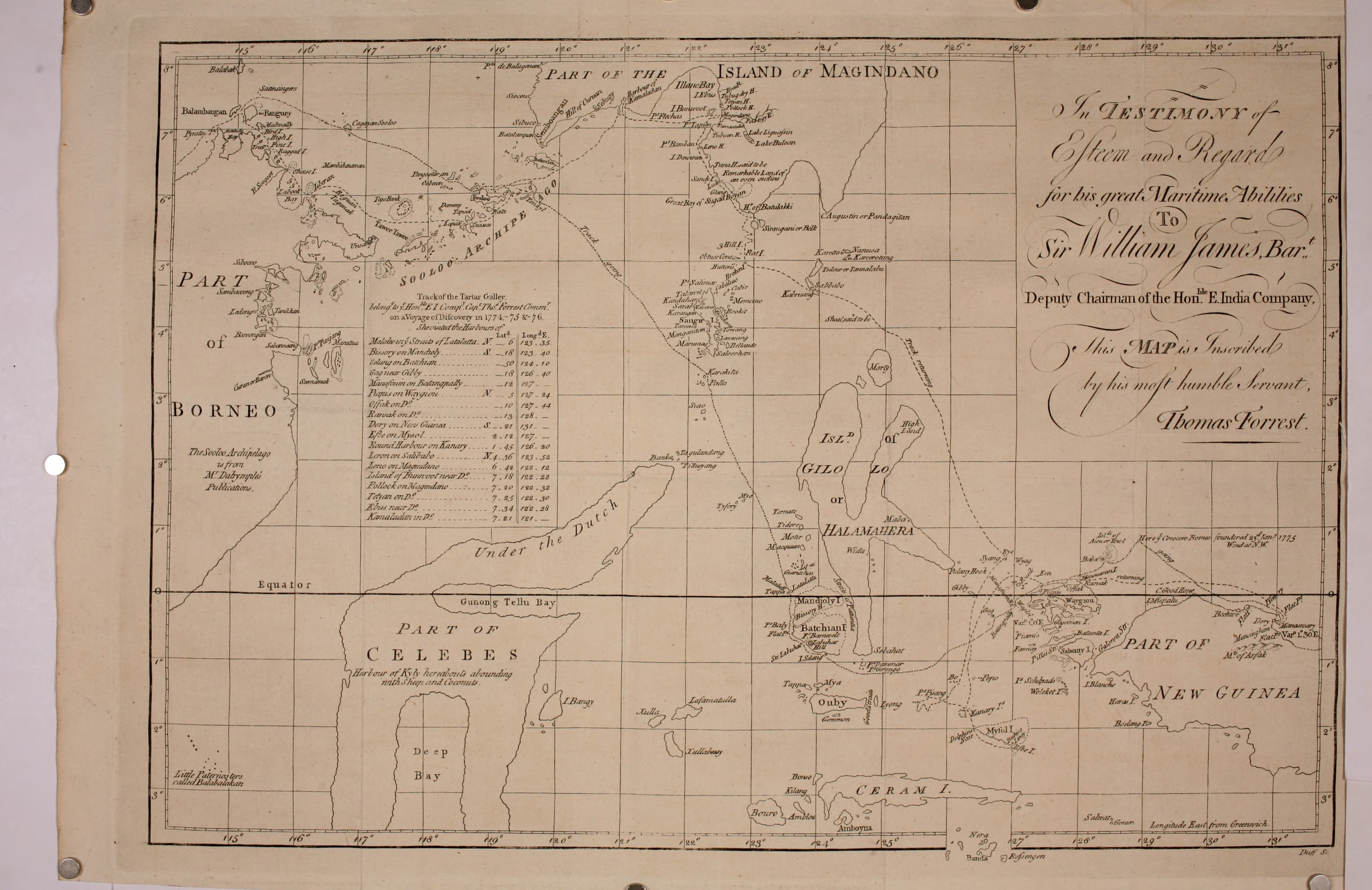
Chart showing the track of the Tartar Galley1774-1776

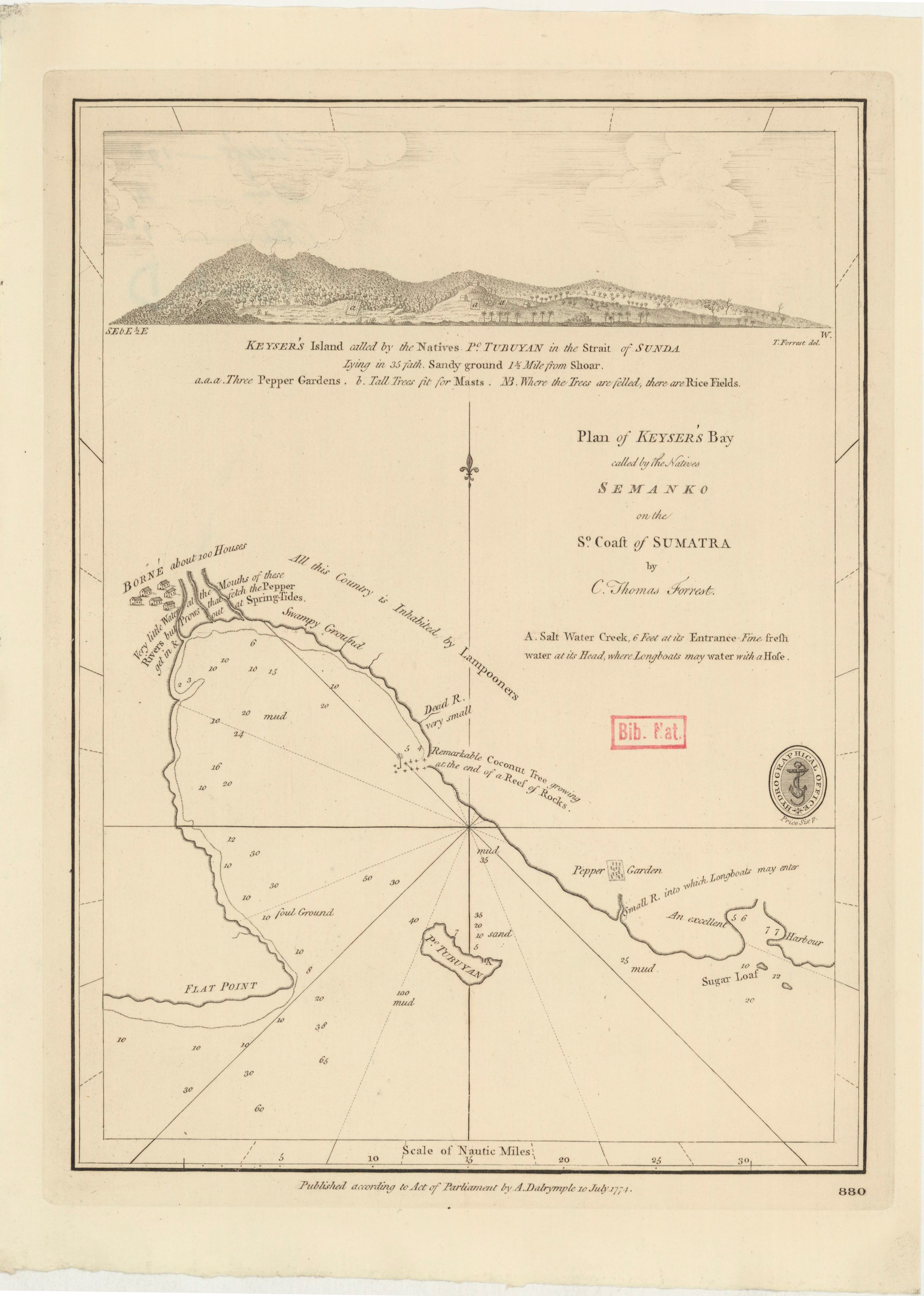
Keyser's Bay or Semanko on the South Coast of Sumatra, Published in 1774 as Admiralty Chart 880

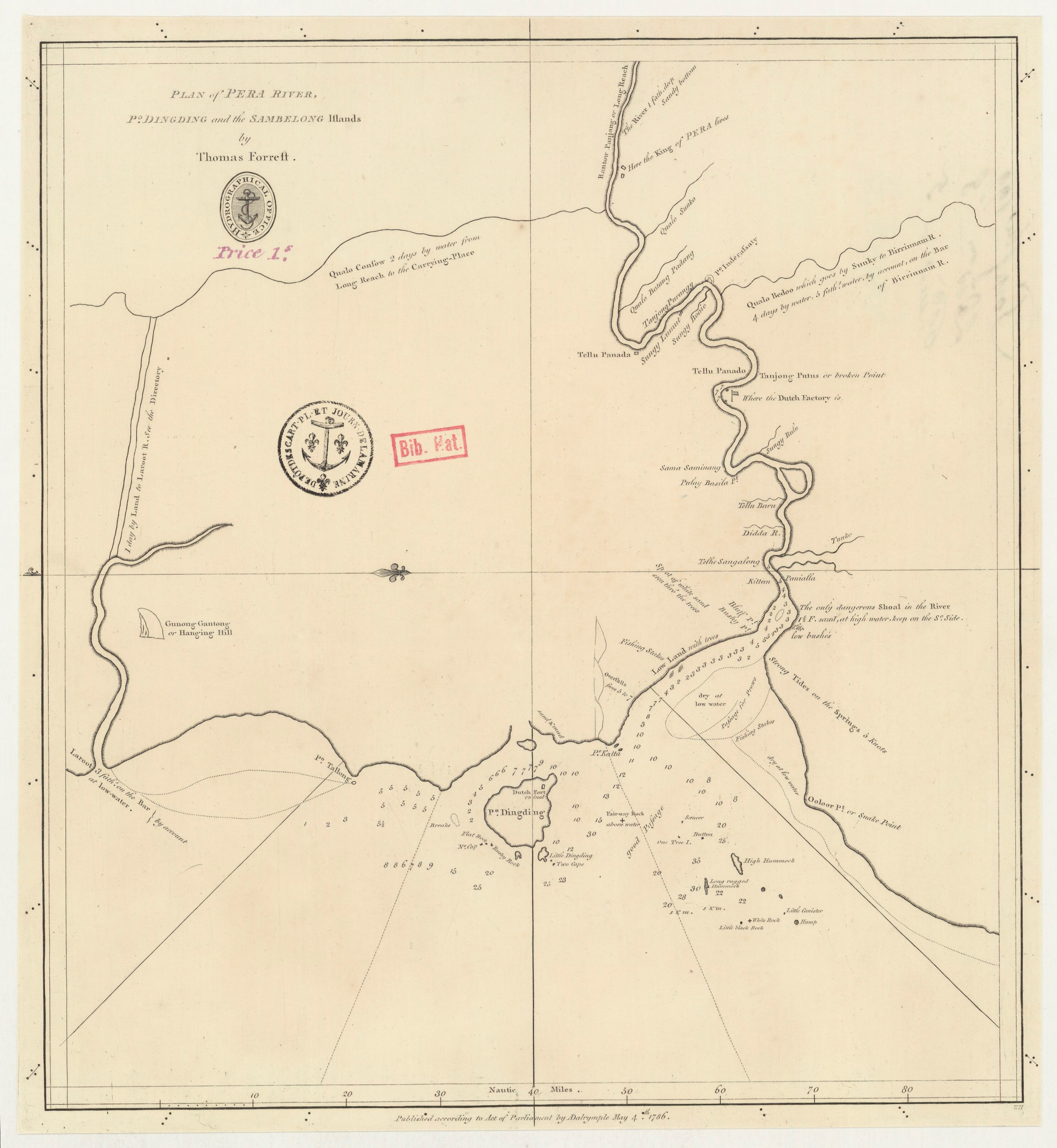
Plan of the Pera River, Pulo Dingding and the Sambelong Islands, Published in 1786 as Admiralty Chart No 845
