= Yampit Nawipa =

Indonesian footballer and politician (born 1989)

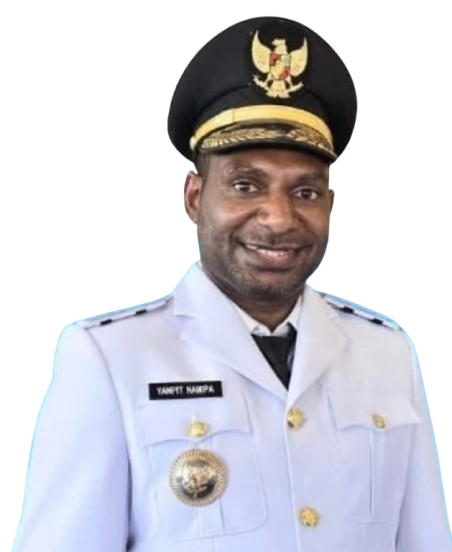
- Official portrait, 2025

Regent of Paniai
- Incumbent
- Assumed office 20 February 2025
- Deputy: Ham Yogi
- Preceded by: Martha Pigome (acting)

Personal details
- Born: 15 January 1989 (age 37) Kebo, Paniai, Indonesia
- Party: Gerindra (2014)
- Education: Cenderawasih University
- Occupation: Politician; Footballer
Association football career
- Position: Forward
Senior career*
Years	Team	Apps	(Gls)
- Persipani Paniai
- * Club domestic league appearances and goals

Yampit Womaki Nawipa (born 15 January 1989), also mononymously known as Womaki, is an Indonesian Papuan politician and semi-professional footballer who has served as the Regent of Paniai since 20 February 2025 with his deputy Ham Yogi.

== Early life ==
Nawipa was born in Kebo, Paniai, Indonesia, on 15 January 1989. He was raised in the Aibon area. He completed his primary education at YPPGI Elementary School Uwamani in 2001. He then studied at YPPGI Junior High School Enarotali and graduated in 2004. Afterward, he enrolled in State Senior High School 1 East Paniai. He then continued his higher education, taking a three-year diploma at Cenderawasih University in 2007 and completed it in 2010. While studying at Cenderawasih University, he served as the Class Representative of the 2007 Cohort of Electrical Engineering major.

Nawipa became the candidate for Paniai Regional House of Representatives in the 2014 Indonesian legislative election from Gerindra representing Ekadide, Aradide, and Bogobaida districts. From 2015 to 2024, he served as the Head of Anak Negeri Paniai Community.

== Sport career ==
=== Football career ===
Nawipa has played football since childhood. He continued playing football when he was a university student. He played for Persipani Paniai, an Indonesian football team, as a forward in the 2022 Liga 3 Papua and 2023 Liga 3 Papua. He earned the award as the best player in both years. His career as a footballer continued when he became the Regent of Paniai. He was included in the Persipani Paniai squad for the 2026–2027 Liga 4 and played in a match against Persika 1951 in which Persipani won 1–0.

=== Chairman of Paniai's KONI ===
Nawipa was inaugurated as the Chairman of Paniai's National Sports Committee of Indonesia (KONI) on 9 January 2020. Under his leadership, he held football training with Paniai youth in the Enarotali Airport airstrip and created KONI boards in all 24 districts in the regency.

In August 2024, six sport governing bodies in Paniai, which were billiard, karate, taekwondo, athletics, and volleyball, issued a motion of no confidence against Nawipa after he announced his regential candidacy in the 2024 Paniai Regent election, prompting them to organize a conference to elect a new chairman of Paniai's KONI to prevent power of vacuum within the organization. Twenty participants were present in the conference, and they elected Martinus Pigai as the chairman for the 2024–2026 term. Responding to this conference, Nawipa said that the event was illegal and there were only three sporting bodies operated legally in Paniai, which were athletics, badminton, and billiards.

== Regent of Paniai ==
Nawipa ran for the regent candidate with his mate Ham Yogi for the 2025–2030 term at 2024 Paniai Regency election. The candidate received endorsement from Indonesian Democratic Party of Struggle and Indonesian Democratic Party of Struggle parties. During the campaign the candidate promised to reform bureaucracy, improve health and education quality, even distribution of infrastructure development, develop economy based on knowledge on high-value-added sectors, and build People-Centered Economy. The candidate won the election by receiving 54.763 votes.

After the election, Neson Uti and Jhon Deki Yogi accused the General Elections Commission (KPU) of Paniai of bribing the Nabire police to secure victory for the Nawipa-Yogi ticket. However, the General Elections Commission (KPU) of Paniai denied the bribery allegation to secure a victory for Nawipa-Yogi ticket and the Constitutional Court rejected the election dispute lawsuit. Prabowo Subianto swore him at Merdeka Palace on 20 February 2025 with 960 other regional heads. The previous Acting Paniai Regent, Martha Pigome, carried out a handover over her office to him on 3 March 2025.

=== Development ===
Nawipa stated that development would be prioritized in villages. To develop village, he stated that fish ponds, fruit farmers, coffee farmers, local food crop farmers, vegetable farmers, chicken farmers, pig farmers must present in the place. Under Nawipa's leadership, Paniai Regency earned the award as the Best performance in Village Fund disbursement in Central Papua on 18 June 2026. He provided equipment and uniforms to the porters and motorbike to motorcycle driver to support people's economy. On 29 June 2026, he inaugurated the former Nabire Regent statue, Karel Gobai.

=== Policies and directives ===
Nawipa issued a regulation requiring restaurants to serve only local Paniai food on Thursdays to support the local economy, and the government imposed a Rp1 million fine on those who refused to execute the regent's order. He also issued an order for commercial and public transportation services to cease operations on Sunday from 6 am to 1 pm because Sunday is a day for worship. On 26 August 2026, he created Paniai's Forest and Land Fire Handling Task Force to anticipate extreme weather and drought. He prohibited student long march in Paniai in July 2024 and told them he did not want to meet them in the office if they still insisted on holding the rally.

=== Art and Sport ===
Nawipa wanted to advance the sports sector in Paniai through KONI. He initiated the intergenerational alumni futsal tournament in Paniai. He invited Papua New Guinean singer Gedix Atege to perform in the event commemorating 29th anniversary celebration of Paniai Regency.
