= Table Mountain (West Papua) =

Mountain in Indonesia

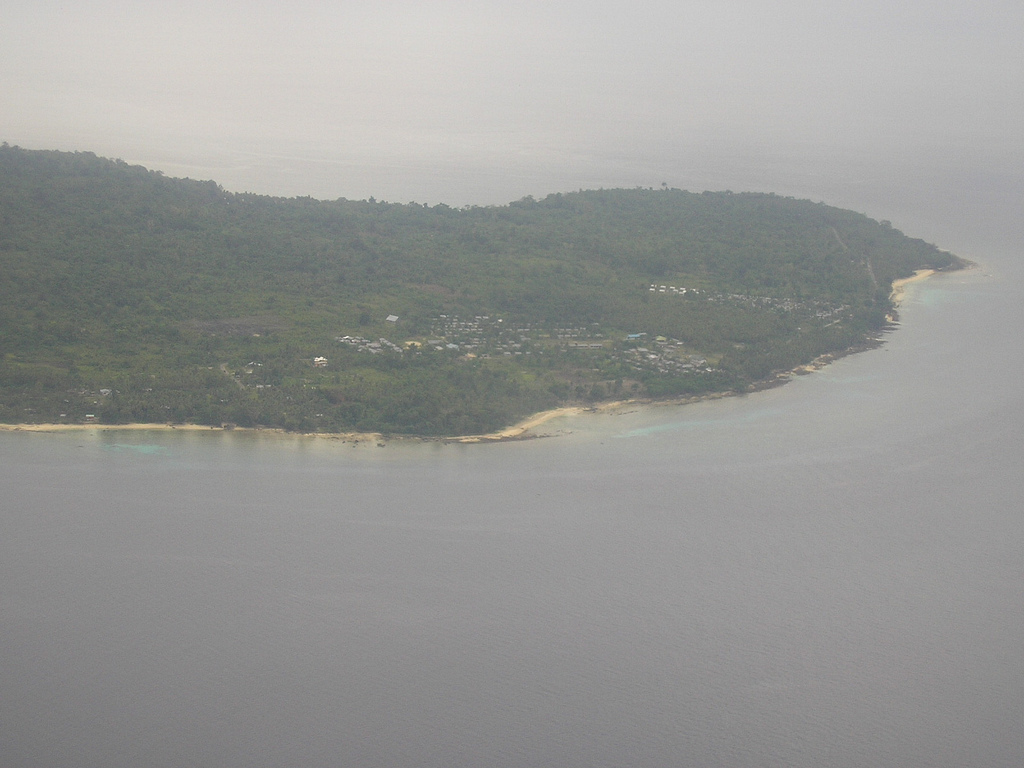
- City of Manokwari, with Table Mountain in the background.

Highest point
- Elevation: 672 ft (205 m)

Geography
- Location: Manokwari, West Papua Province, Indonesia
- Parent range: Arfak Mountains

Table Mountain is a small hill near Manokwari in West Papua Province, Indonesia. The hill is part of the Arfak Mountains range. The mountain, at 672 ft (205 m) in elevation, is named for its "table" formation seen from a distance.

== Ecology ==
It is home to a large tropical rainforest named the Table Mountain Forest. There are many species of plants, animals, and mushrooms. The Table Mountain Forest Reserve covers about 83% of the rainforest and the mountain.

== Recreation ==
The mountain is ideal for mostly hiking, and there are many natural caves that are filled with bats, reptiles, and insects.

At the top of the mountain is the Japanese Veterans Memorial. This monument is to honor the soldiers of the Japanese army division 221 and 225 who died during World War II. From the summit is a great view of the central business district of Manokwari. The Japanese Veterans Memorial covers about 17% of the rainforest and the mountain.

== See also ==
- Landforms of West Papua (province)
