= Marinda Airport =

Coordinates: 00°25′31.8″S 130°46′33″E

Marinda Airport Bandar Udara Marinda
- IATA: RJM; ICAO: WASN

Summary
- Airport type: Public
- Owner: Government of Indonesia
- Operator: Ministry of Transportation
- Serves: Waisai
- Location: Waisai, Raja Ampat Regency, Southwest Papua, Indonesia
- Time zone: WIT (UTC+09:00)
- Elevation AMSL: 9 ft / 3 m

Map
- Location in Raja Ampat Islands Location in Western New Guinea Location in Indonesia

Runways
Direction	Length		Surface
Direction	ft	m	Surface
18/36	4,593	1,400	Asphalt
- Sources: Indonesian Ministry of Transportation

Marinda Airport (IATA: RJM, ICAO: WASN), also known as Raja Ampat Airport, is an airport serving Waisai, Raja Ampat Regency, Southwest Papua, Indonesia. The airport serves as one of the main ports of entry to the Raja Ampat Islands, which contains the richest marine biodiversity on earth; it is second in the province only to the larger Domine Eduard Osok Airport in Sorong. Marinda Airport was inaugurated on 9 May 2012 by former Minister of Transport E. E. Mangindaan. The airport was built due to the rapid increase of tourism around Raja Ampat Islands and the remoteness of the surrounding area, which was previously very difficult to access. The airport can only accommodate small aircraft such as the ATR-72.

The initial construction of the airport was carried out in 2007, five years after Raja Ampat became its own regency. In 2010 there was a runway with a length of 800 meters with a width of 18 meters which was financed by government funds. In 2012 the runway was extended and widened to 1,200 meters at 30 meters by government funds. On December 19, 2014, the airport originally managed by the Work Unit (Satker) turned into a UPBU. Due to the pursuit of the Sail Raja Ampat event in 2014 which was attended by President Susilo Bambang Yudhoyono and other state officials, the runway was extended again to 1,400 meters. The apron was expanded to 90 meters by 75 meters using government funds. It also built a building for power house, generator with a capacity of 150 Kwh, buildings and fire trucks.

== Airlines and destinations ==
Airlines	Destinations
Susi Air	Kabare, Sorong
