= 2022 Liga 3 Papua =

Tournament details
- Country: Indonesia
- Dates: 28 September 2022
- Teams: 7

Final positions
- Champions: Persipani Paniai
- Qualified for: 2022 Liga 3 National Round

Tournament statistics
- Matches played: 9
- Goals scored: 27 (3 per match)

The 2022 Liga 3 Papua is the fifth edition of the Liga 3 Zone Papua Province organized by Asprov PSSI Papua.

Followed by 8 clubs. The winner of this competition will immediately advance to the national round without passing the regional round Papua representing Papua Province to get promoted to Liga 2.

Toli is the defending champion after winning it in the 2021 season.

== Teams ==
League 3 Papua this season was attended by 7 teams from 3 provinces, namely Papua and the three provinces resulting from their separation. The following is a list of participating teams;

Province	Location	Team
Papua	Jayapura Regency	Persidafon
Papua	Supiori Regency	PS Embun Supiori
Central Papua	Mimika Regency	Waanal Brothers Mimika
Central Papua	Paniai Regency	Persipani
Central Papua	Intan Jaya Regency	Persintan
Central Papua	Nabire Regency	Persinab
Highland Papua	Tolikara Regency	Toli

== Venues ==
- Mandala Stadium, Jayapura
- Mahandra Uncen Stadium, Jayapura
- Barnabas Youwe Stadium, Jayapura Regency

== Group stage ==
Pos	Team	Pld	W	D	L	GF	GA	GD	Pts	Qualification	PPI	PNB	TLI	WBR	PTN	PSE	PFN
1	Persipani	6	4	2	0	18	4	+14	14	Advance to National round	—	2–1	0–0		4–0		
2	Persinab	6	4	0	2	15	12	+3	12			—	4–2				
3	Toli	6	3	2	1	10	4	+6	11				—				
4	Waanal Brothers Mimika	6	3	2	1	15	8	+7	11		2–2	3–1	0–3	—	6–1		
5	Persintan	6	1	2	3	6	13	−7	5			2–3	0–0		—		
6	PS Embun Supiori	6	1	1	4	6	14	−8	4		0–6	1–3	0–2	1–1	1–2	—	
7	Persidafon	6	0	1	5	2	17	−15	1		1–4	0–3	0–3	0–3	1–1	0–3	—

Updated to match(es) played on unknown. Source: Liga 3 2022 Papua
