= Persipani Paniai =

Indonesian football club

Persipani
- Full name: Persatuan Sepakbola Indonesia Paniai
- Nicknames: Laskar Koteka from Wissel Meren; Papua Shrimps
- Ground: Soeharto Field; Paniai, Central Papua
- Owner: PSSI Paniai Regency
- Chairman: Meky Nawipa
- Manager: Noak Gobai
- Coach: Mohammad Azhar
- League: Liga Nusantara
- 2026–27: TBD
Home colours	Away colours

Persatuan Sepakbola Indonesia Paniai (simply known as Persipani) is an Indonesian football club based in Enarotali, Paniai Regency, Central Papua. They currently plays in Liga Nusantara but was disqualified from the competition for not playing the first three consecutive matches and relegated directly to Liga 4.

== Players ==
=== Current squad ===
As of 15 December 2024

Note: Flags indicate national team as defined under FIFA eligibility rules; some limited exceptions apply. Players may hold more than one non-FIFA nationality.

No.	Pos.	Nation	Player
1	GK	IDN	Nur Husnan
2	DF	IDN	Apsalom Hababuk
3	DF	IDN	Lomeros Merani
4	DF	IDN	Miuquel Alfrado
6	MF	IDN	Yance Silfanus
7	MF	IDN	Harberd Akhova
9	FW	IDN	Daniel Wonda
10	FW	IDN	Yampit Nawipa
11	FW	IDN	Yosmus Dudai
12	FW	IDN	Ricky Kayame (captain)
14	DF	IDN	Rusmin Pattiiha
15	FW	IDN	Heslon Kakadi
17	FW	IDN	Jhon Wutoy

No.	Pos.	Nation	Player
18	MF	IDN	Karel Gobai
19	FW	IDN	Frengki Kayame
20	GK	IDN	Juvero Inas
21	DF	IDN	Henison Salawala
25	MF	IDN	Gerson Flassy
26	FW	IDN	Roberto Sauyai
28	FW	IDN	Yohanes Petege
29	FW	IDN	Steven Wenda
30	GK	IDN	Dava Pratama
31	MF	IDN	Nando Tebai
45	DF	IDN	Anton Ramandei
74	DF	IDN	Ndawi Wandik
91	MF	IDN	Robby Taniyauw

== Season-by-season records ==
Season(s)	League/Division	Tier	Tms.	Pos.	Piala Indonesia
2010–11	Second Division	4	64	third round	—
2011–12	First Division	3	66	first round	—
2013	First Division	3	77	first round, 3rd in Group 11	—
2014	First Division	3	73	third round, 4th in Group U	—
2015	Liga Nusantara	3	season abandoned		—
2016					
2017	Liga 3	3	32	eliminated in provincial phase	—
2018					
2019	Liga 3	3	32	eliminated in provincial phase	—
2020	Liga 3	3	season abandoned		—
2021–22					
2022–23	Liga 3	3	season abandoned		—
2023–24	Liga 3	3	80	third round, 4th in Group 3	—
2024–25	Liga Nusantara	3	16	disqualified	—
2025–26	Liga 4	4	64	fourth round, 3rd in Group A	—
2026–27	Liga Nusantara	3	24	TBD	—

== Honours ==
- Liga 3 Papua
  - Champion (1): 2022
- Liga 4 Central Papua
  - Champion (1): 2025–26
