= Prafi =

District in West Papua, Indonesia

- District
- Location in West Papua
- Coordinates: 0°52′38.45928″S 133°49′17.30244″E
- Country: Indonesia
- Province: West Papua
- Regency: Manokwari

Area
  - Total: 280.14 km^{2} (108.16 sq mi)

Population (mid 2024)
  - Total: 19,351
  - Density: 69.076/km^{2} (178.91/sq mi)
- Time zone: UTC+9 (WIT)
- Postal Code: 98316

Prafi is an administrative district (distrik) in Manokwari Regency, West Papua Province of Indonesia. It is situated to the west of Manokwari town.
