= Waisai =

- Town
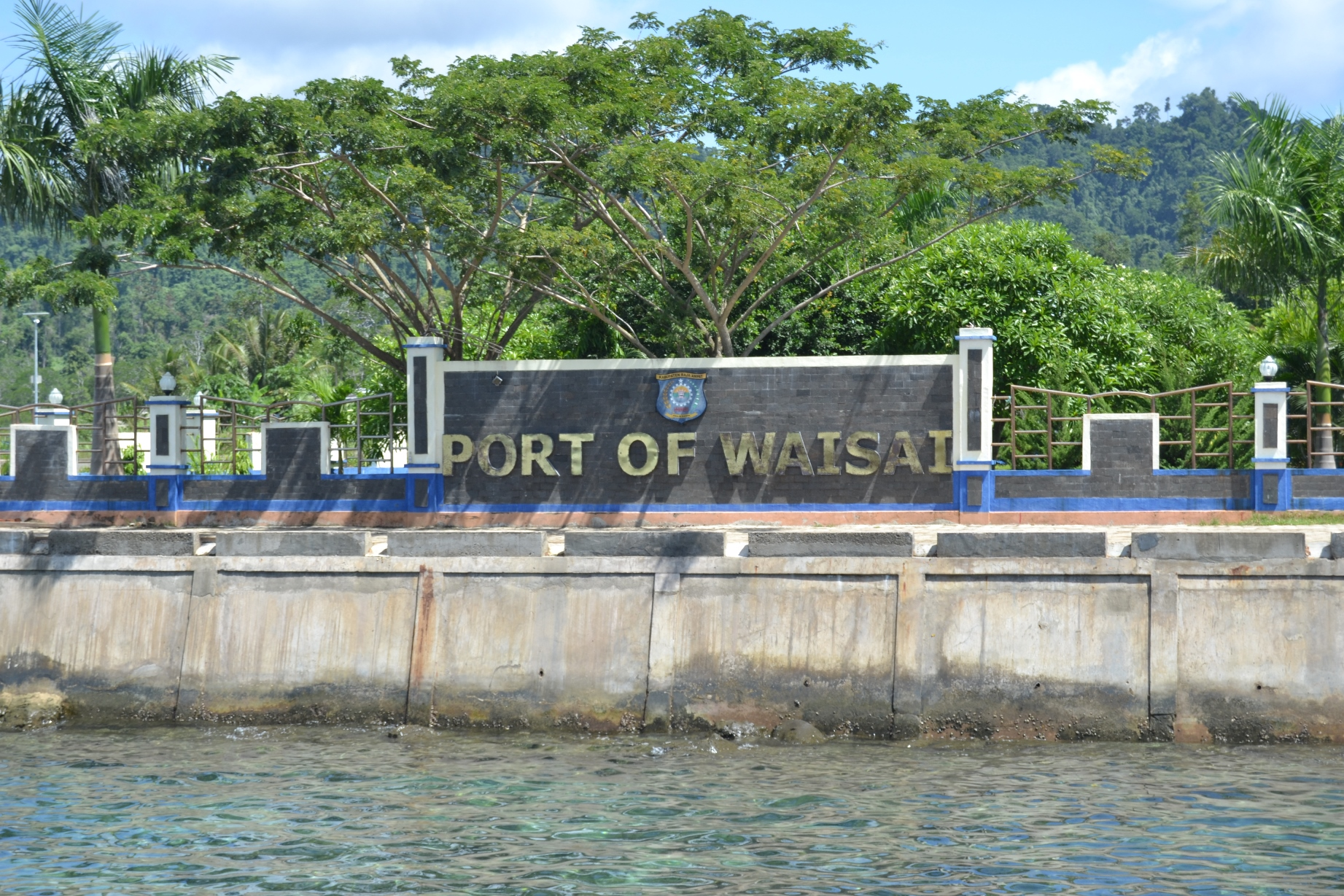
- The Port of Waisai

- Location of Waisai in Raja Ampat Islands Location of Waisai in Western New Guinea
- Coordinates: 0°25′23.5″S 130°49′6.8″E
- Country: Indonesia
- Province: Southwest Papua
- Regency: Raja Ampat Regency
- Founded: 2003

Area
  - Total: 295.12 km^{2} (113.95 sq mi)

Population
  - Estimate (2021): 22.541
  - Density: 67.63/km^{2} (175.2/sq mi)
- Time zone: UTC+9 (WIT)
- Area code: +62951

Waisai is a town in the south of the island of Waigeo in the Raja Ampat Islands, Indonesia. Founded in 2003, it is the capital of the Raja Ampat Regency and is home to a little over 8,000 people. It is a transit point for tourists visiting the rest of the archipelago, and its airport is reachable by plane from the larger cities of Manado and Sorong, or ferry from the latter. While it is mainly a stopping point for tourists before continuing to the rest of the islands, the town includes a dive resort, several accommodations, and two beaches.

== Climate ==
Waisai has a tropical rainforest climate (Af) with heavy rainfall year-round. Unlike most parts of Indonesia, it experiences a rainfall maximum during the low-sun season due to local wind currents.

Climate data for Waisai
Month	Jan	Feb	Mar	Apr	May	Jun	Jul	Aug	Sep	Oct	Nov	Dec	Year
Mean daily maximum °C (°F)	29.3 (84.7)	29.1 (84.4)	29.1 (84.4)	29.3 (84.7)	29.1 (84.4)	28.5 (83.3)	27.9 (82.2)	28.1 (82.6)	28.6 (83.5)	29.5 (85.1)	29.8 (85.6)	29.5 (85.1)	29.0 (84.2)
Daily mean °C (°F)	26.0 (78.8)	25.8 (78.4)	25.9 (78.6)	26.0 (78.8)	26.0 (78.8)	25.6 (78.1)	25.1 (77.2)	25.2 (77.4)	25.5 (77.9)	26.1 (79.0)	26.4 (79.5)	26.2 (79.2)	25.8 (78.5)
Mean daily minimum °C (°F)	22.7 (72.9)	22.6 (72.7)	22.8 (73.0)	22.8 (73.0)	22.9 (73.2)	22.7 (72.9)	22.3 (72.1)	22.4 (72.3)	22.5 (72.5)	22.7 (72.9)	23.0 (73.4)	22.9 (73.2)	22.7 (72.8)
Average rainfall mm (inches)	177 (7.0)	187 (7.4)	190 (7.5)	223 (8.8)	309 (12.2)	326 (12.8)	287 (11.3)	245 (9.6)	200 (7.9)	164 (6.5)	162 (6.4)	170 (6.7)	2,640 (104.1)
Source: Climate-Data.org
