= Sanggeng Stadium =

Multi-purpose stadium in Indonesia

- Location in West Papua
- Location: Manokwari, West Papua, Indonesia
- Coordinates: 0.867538°S 134.061468°E
- Owner: Government of Manokwari City
- Operator: Government of Manokwari City
- Capacity: 10,000
- Surface: Grass field

Tenants
- Perseman Manokwari; PS Kamasan

Sanggeng Stadium is a multi-purpose stadium in Manokwari, Indonesia. It is currently used mostly for football matches and is used as the home venue for Perseman Manokwari. The stadium holds 10,000 seats.

In 2022, the stadium was renovated for its use in anniversary celebrations for the Republic of Indonesia.
