= Raja Ampat Regency =

Regency in Southwest Papua, Indonesia

Raja Ampat Regency Kabupaten Raja Ampat
- Regency
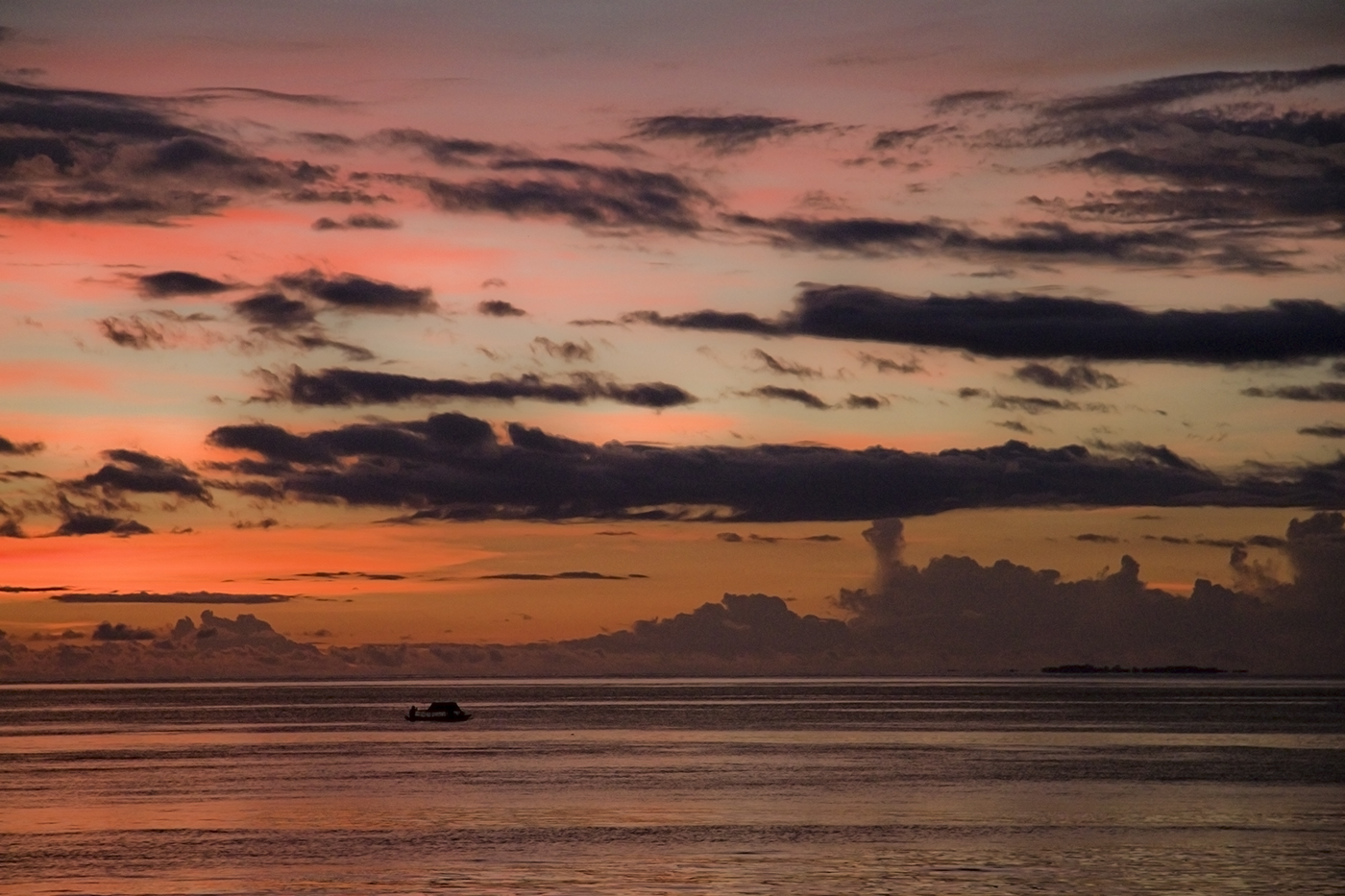
- Sunset in Raja Ampat

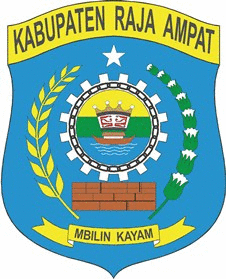
- Coat of arms
- Motto: Mbilin Kayam (Maya-Biak: Building Together)
- Location in Southwest Papua

- Location in Indonesia
- Coordinates: 0°50′S 130°30′E
- Country: Indonesia
- Province: Southwest Papua
- Capital: Waisai

Government
  - Regent: Orideko Iriano Burdam
  - Vice Regent: Mansyur Syahdan

Area
  - Total: 7,559.61 km^{2} (2,918.78 sq mi)

Population (mid 2025 estimate)
  - Total: 74,965
  - Density: 9.9165/km^{2} (25.684/sq mi)
- Time zone: UTC+9 (Indonesia Eastern Time)
- Area code: (+62) 956
- Website: rajaampatkab.go.id

Raja Ampat Regency is a regency of Southwest Papua Province of Indonesia. The regency, which was formed by separating the archipelago from Sorong Regency, based on the Law 26 of 2002, was inaugurated on 12 April 2003. It consists of a number of groups of islands situated off the north-west end of West Papua; the four main islands from south to north are Misool, Salawati, Batanta, and Waigeo, but there are thousands of smaller islands and islets. At present, the regency covers a land area of 7,559.61 km^{2}, with a total area (including 59,820.01 km^{2} of sea area) stated as 67,379.61 km^{2}. It had a population of 42,508 at the 2010 Census and 64,141 at the 2020 Census; the official estimate as of mid-2025 was 74,965 (comprising 38,979 males and 35,986 females). The principal town lies at Waisai on Waigeo Island.

On 25 October 2013 the People's Representative Council (DPR) began reviewing draft laws on the establishment of new regencies, including two new regencies of North Raja Ampat and South Raja Ampat within the borders of the existing Raja Ampat Regency. As at May 2024, these changes have not yet been implemented.

== Raja Ampat's scenery ==
Raja Ampat is known for its beautiful sea and scenery. It is recognized as the home of the largest coral reef biodiversity in the world. With more than 550 distinct variety of coral, 700 different kinds of mollusks, and 1427 different species of fish, it is a significant center for marine biodiversity. Seventy-five percent of all known coral species may be found in the seas around the Raja Ampat Islands, which are home to some of the world's most diverse species. Under the Terumbu Karang Sehat Indonesia programme, Konservasi Indonesia supported the development of a tourism spatial plan for Raja Ampat Regency and drafted provisions for a local tourism-management regulation.

== Geography ==
Raja Ampat Regency is a regency located at a position of 2° 25' north latitude to 40° 25' latitude south, and 130° – 132° 55' east longitude. Administratively, the boundaries of the Raja Ampat Regency are as follows:

- North: Bounded by the Pacific Ocean.
- South: Bounded by the Seram Sea.
- West: Bounded by the Seram Sea, Central Halmahera Regency, North Maluku Province.
- East: Bounded by West Sorong District, Sorong City, Aimas District and Seget District (of Sorong Regency) and Seram Sea/

== Administrative districts ==
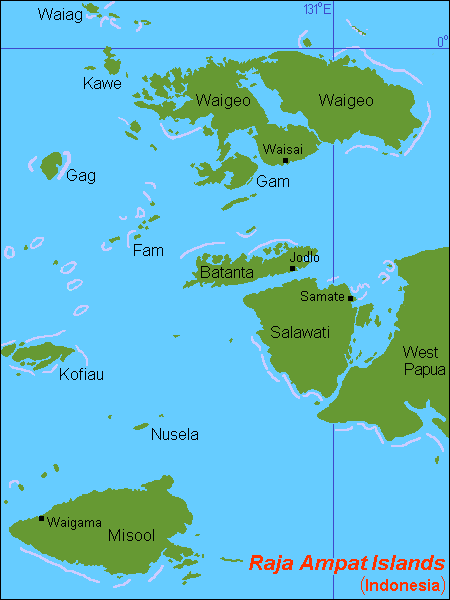
The Raja Ampat Archipelago

At the 2010 Census, the regency was divided into seventeen districts (kecamatan). Subsequently, seven additional districts have been created by the division of existing districts. The twenty-four districts are tabulated below with their areas and their populations at the 2010 Census and the 2020 Census, together with the official estimates as of mid-2025. They are grouped according to the proposed split into three regencies currently under consideration (since 2013) by the government, but postponed due to the government moratorium on the creation of new regencies. The table also includes the locations of the district administrative centres, the number of administrative villages in each district (4 urban kelurahan in Waisai Town District, and 114 rural kampung in all the other districts), the number of named islands in each district, and its postal code.

Kode Kemendagri	Name of District (distrik)	Land area in km^{2}	Pop'n Census 2010	Pop'n Census 2020	Pop'n Estimate mid 2025	Admin centre	No. of villages	No. of islands	Post code	Villages
92.05.13	Misool Selatan (South Misool)	91.16	3,026	3,504	4,079	Dabatan	5	295	98485	Dabatan, Fafanlap, Harapan Jaya, Usaha Jaya, Yellu
92.05.16	Misool Barat (West Misool)	336.84	1,291	1,498	2,072	Lilinta	5	79	98484	Biga, Gamta, Kapatcol, Lilinta, Magey
92.05.01	Misool (or Misool Utara)	1,235.68	1,761	2,017	2,788	Salafen	5	38	98483	Aduwei, Atkari, Salafen, Solal, Waigama
92.05.10	Kofiau	206.23	2,520	2,599	2,975	Mikiran	5	29	98482	Awat, Deer, DibalaI, Mikiran, Tolobi
92.05.06	Misool Timur (East Misool)	553.66	2,651	2,835	3,146	Folley	6	136	98486	Audam, Folley, Limalas Barat, Limalas Timur, Tomolol, Usaha Jaya
92.05.17	Kepulauan Sembilan (Sembilan Islands)	17.21	1,458	1,458	1,660	Weijim Barat	4	16	98481	Pulau Tikus, Satukurano, Wejim Barat, Wejim Timur
	Total Raja Ampat Selatan	2,440.78	12,707	13,911	16,720		30	593		
92.05.04	Salawati Utara (North Salawati)	38.52	2,144	2,597	3,010	Samate	6	59	98495	Jefman Barat, Jefman Timur, Kapatlap, Samate, Waidim, Wamega
92.05.22	Salawati Tengah ^{(a)} (Central Salawati)	572.47	1,917	1,992	2,305	Kalobo	7		98494	Kalobo, Sakabu, Waibu, Waijan, Wailabu, Wailen, Waimeci
92.05.21	Salawati Barat (West Salawati)	502.47	899	1,121	1,338	Solol	4		98493	Kaliam, Kalwal, Solol, Waibon
92.05.25	Batanta Selatan (South Batanta)	188.77	1,312	1,598	1,867	Yenanas	4		98491	Amdui, Wailebet, Waiman, Yenanas
92.05.20	Batanta Utara (North Batanta)	290.75	909	1,599	2,132	Yensawai Timur	4		98492	Arefi Selatan, Arefi Timur, Yensawai Barat, Yensawai Timur
	Total Raja Ampat Tengah	1,592.98	7,181	8,907	10,652		25	59		
92.05.03	Waigeo Selatan (South Waigeo)	240.12	1,715	2,173	2,599	Saonek	5	197	98475	Friwen, Saonek, Saporkren, Wawiyai, Yenbeser
92.05.09	Teluk Mayalibit (Mayalibit Bay)	621.93	846	1,297	1,604	Yenanas	4	34	98473	Kalitoko, Lopintol, Mumes, Warsamdin
92.05.11	Meos Mansar	218.87	1,625	2,221	2,769	Yinbekwan	9		98472	Arborek, Kabuy, Kapisawar, Kurkapa, Sawandarek, Sawinggrai, Yenbekwan, Yenbuba, Yenwaupnor
92.05.18	Kota Waisai (Waisai Town)	121.87	6,976	21,797	23,798	Waisai	4		98471	Bonwakir, Sapordanco, Waisai, Warmasen (all kelurahan)
92.05.19	Tiplol Mayalibit	200.51	930	1,171	1,356	Go	6		98474	Arway, Beo, Go, Kabilol, Waifoi, Warimak
92.05.07	Waigeo Barat (West Waigeo)	763.64	1,409	1,786	2,123	Waisilip	5	327	98464	Bianci, Mutus, Saleo, Selpele, Waisilip
92.05.15	Waigeo Barat Kepulauan (West Waigeo Islands)	103.30	2,084	2,768	3,216	Manyaifun	6	22	98465	Gag, Manyaifun, Meosmanggara, Pam, Saukabu, Saupapir
92.05.02	Waigeo Utara (North Waigeo)	149.57	1,477	1,800	2,300	Kabare	6		98466	Andey, Asukweri, Bonsayor, Darumbab, Kabare, Kalisade
92.05.14	Warwarbomi	297.33	1,045	1,389	1,538	Warwanai	4		98467	Boni, Mnier, Warkori, Warmanai
92.05.23	Supnin	223.82	908	1,117	1,283	Rauki	4		98463	Duber, Kapadiri, Rauki, Urai
92.05.05	Kepulauan Ayau ^{(b)} (Ayau Islands)	12.66	1,230	1,092	1,468	Abidon	5		98462	Boiseran, Dorehkar, Runi, Yenkanfan, Yenkawir
92.05.24	Ayau ^{(b)}	5.83	989	1,103	1,552	Dorehkar	4	45	98461	Abidon, Meosbekwan, Reni, Rutum
92.05.08	Waigeo Timur (East Waigeo)	555.40	1,386	1,609	1,987	Urbinasopen	4	27	98476	Puper, Urbinasopen, Yenbekaki, Yensner
	Total Raja Ampat Utara	3,514.85	22,620	41,323	47,593		63	652		
	Total Regency	7,559.61	42,508	64,141	74,965	Kota Waisai (town)	118	2,179		

Note: (a) not to be confused with the similarly named Salawati Tengah District within Sorong Regency.
(b) the Ayau Islands (including Ayau District) lie some distance to the north of Waigeo.

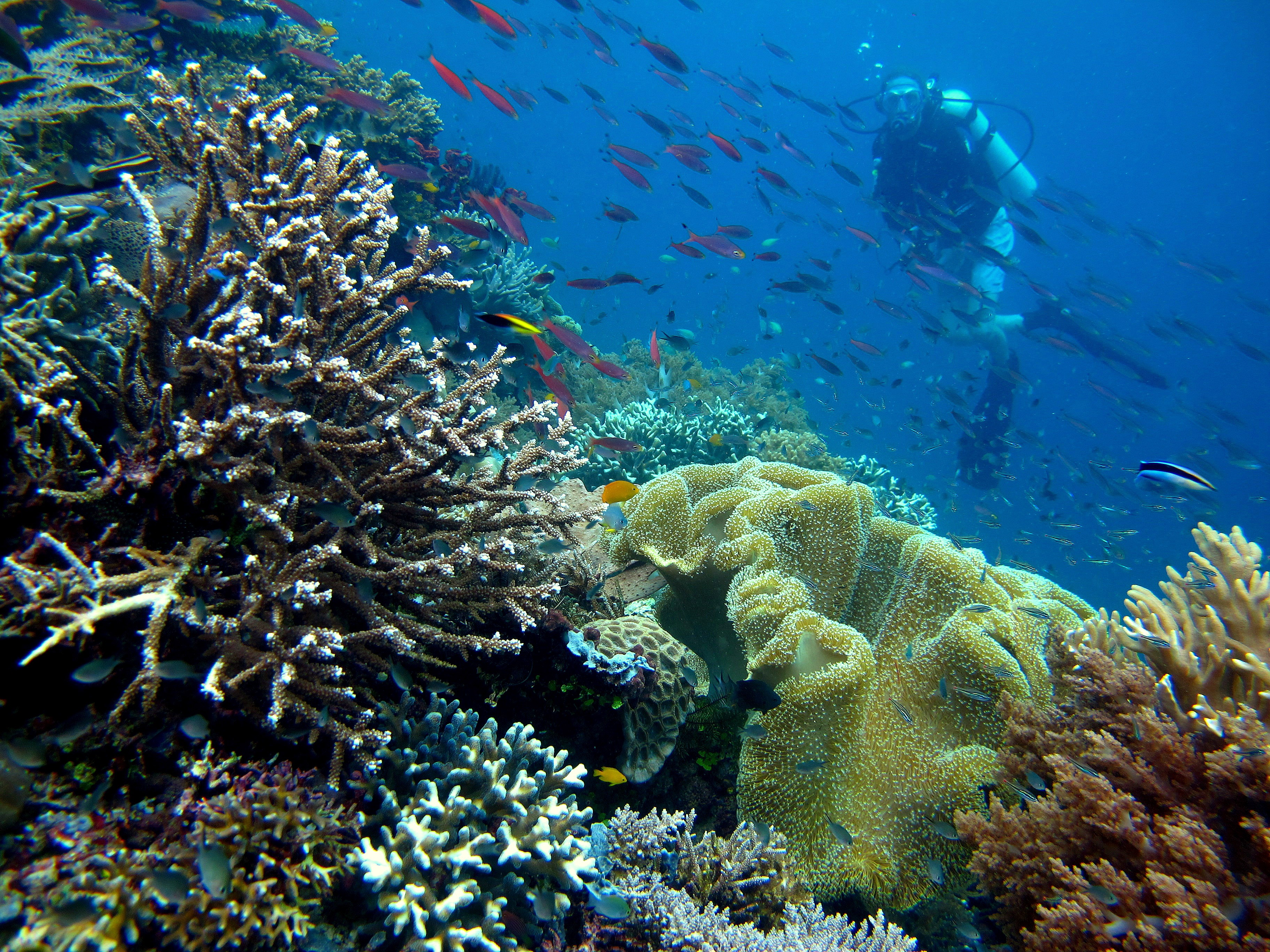
Coral reef off of Piaynemo, an island in Misool District

Since 2010, the new Waisai district has been created from part of Waigeo Selatan District, the new Tiplol Mayalibit District has been created from part of Teluk Mayalibit District, the new Supnin District has been created from part of Waigeo Utara District, and the new Ayau District has been created from part of Kepulauan Ayau District.

== Proposed further changes ==
Misool and Kofiau Islands (comprising the first six districts listed above) are currently under Indonesian government consideration to be split off to form a separate South Raja Ampat Regency under proposals approved in 2014 by the Indonesian Parliament. Similarly, Waigeo and its surrounding small islands (comprising the last thirteen districts listed above) are currently under Indonesian government consideration to be split off to form a separate North Raja Ampat Regency under proposals approved in 2014 by the Indonesian Parliament. However, as at 2024, these changes have not yet been implemented.

The proposed splits from the existing regency would leave the five remaining districts, mainly consisting of Salawati and Batanta Islands, in the centre of the existing regency; note that the southern half of Salawati Island does not form part of the existing regency, but instead constitutes the Salawati Selatan and Salawati Tengah Districts of Sorong Regency, the latter having the same name as Salawati Tengah District of Raja Ampat Regency. Since 2010, the new Salawati Tengah and Salawati Barat districts have been created from parts of Salawati Utara District, while the former Selat Sagawin District has been divided into two new districts - Batanta Utara and Batanta Selatan.

== Transport ==
=== Air ===
In early May 2012, a 1,200 metres runway of Marinda Airport on Waigeo Island was officially opened by the Transportation minister and Raja Ampat official. The runway was later extended to 2,000 metres and was predicted to be finished in 2013.
