= Paniai Regency =

Regency in Central Papua, Indonesia

Paniai Regency Kabupaten Paniai
- Regency
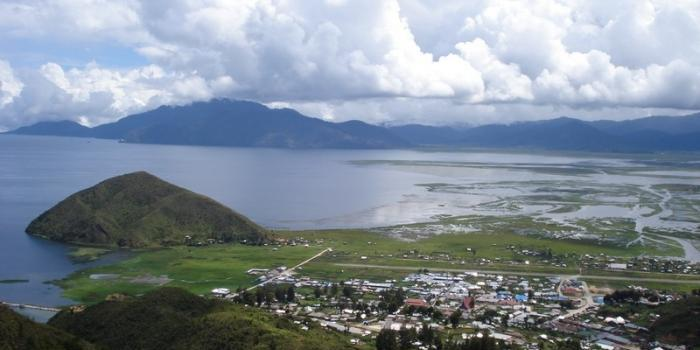
- Lake Paniai and the town of Enarotali

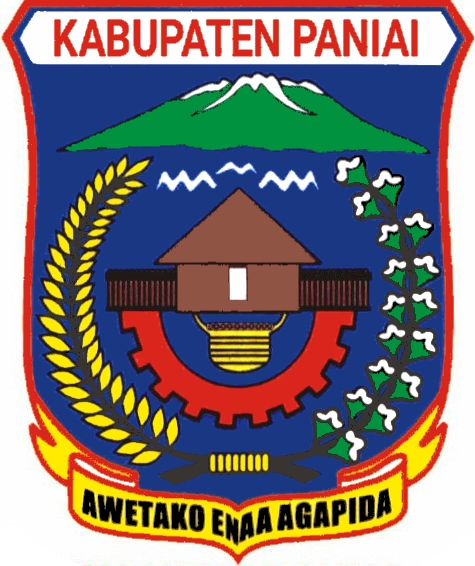
- Coat of arms
- Motto: Awetako Enaa Agapida (Tomorrow Better than Today)
- Location in Central Papua

- Location in Indonesian Papua Location in Indonesia
- Coordinates: 3.9000°S 136.6000°E
- Country: Indonesia
- Province: Central Papua
- Capital: Enarotali

Government
  - Regent: Yampit Nawipa
  - Vice Regent: Ham Yogi

Area
  - Total: 6,525.25 km^{2} (2,519.41 sq mi)

Population (mid 2023 estimate)
  - Total: 227,254
  - Density: 34.8269/km^{2} (90.2012/sq mi)
- Time zone: UTC+9 (Indonesia Eastern Time)
- Area code: (+62) 971
- Website: paniai.go.id

Paniai Regency is one of the regencies (kabupaten) in Central Papua Province of Indonesia. It is named after the Paniai Lakes. It covers an area of 6,525.25 km^{2}, and had a population of 153,432 at the 2010 Census and 220,410 at the 2020 Census; the official estimate as of mid-2024 was 227,254 - comprising 124,260 males and 102,994 females. The administrative centre is the town of Enarotali, in East Paniai.

== Administrative districts ==
At the 2010 Census, Paniai Regency comprised ten districts (distrik). However, by 2018 the splitting of existing districts to create additional ones had raised the total to twenty-four districts. These are tabulated below with their areas and their populations at the 2010 census and 2020 Census. The table also includes the locations of the district administrative centres, the number of administrative villages in each district (totaling 216 rural kampung and 5 urban kelurahan), and its post code.

| Kode Wilayah | Name of District (distrik) | Area in km^{2} | Pop'n 2010 census | Pop'n 2020 census | Admin centre | No. of villages | Post code |
|---|---|---|---|---|---|---|---|
| 94.03.01 | Paniai Timur (East Paniai) | 588.80 | 32,864 | 13,581 | Enarotali | 26 ^{(a)} | 98711 -98714 |
| 94.03.09 | Yatamo | 130.84 | 14,435 | 5,727 | Wotai | 5 | 98726 |
| 94.03.08 | Kebo | 359.82 | 19,017 | 5,391 | Kebo I | 13 | 98715 |
| 94.03.13 | Pugo Dagi | ^{(b)} | ^{(b)} | 2,676 | Pugo | 9 | 98719 |
| 94.03.11 | Wegee Muka | ^{(b)} | ^{(b)} | 16,310 | Badawo | 11 ^{(c)} | 98717 |
| 94.03.12 | Wegee Bino | ^{(b)} | ^{(b)} | 9,740 | Dei | 9 | 98716 |
| 94.03.17 | Yagai | ^{(b)} | ^{(b)} | 7,930 | Panibagata | 10 | 98718 |
| 94.03.20 | Deiyai Miyo | ^{(b)} | ^{(b)} | 2,899 | Deiyamo | 6 | 98725 |
| 94.03.05 | Bibida | 450.00 | 1,781 | 7,337 | Bibida | 7 ^{(c)} | 98741 |
| 94.03.06 | Dumadama | 1,404.00 | 4,860 | 4,750 | Duma | 5 | 98743 |
| 94.03.21 | Dogomo | ^{(b)} | ^{(b)} | 6,542 | Dogomo | 5 | 98742 |
| 94.03.03 | Aradide | 262.67 | 13,045 | 13,161 | Abatadi | 9 | 98731 |
| 94.03.10 | Ekadide | 187.62 | 20,734 | 17,416 | Pasir Putih | 12 | 98733 |
| 94.03.22 | Aweida | ^{(b)} | ^{(b)} | 1,936 | Deta | 6 | 98732 |
| 94.03.24 | Fajar Timur (East Fajar) | ^{(b)} | ^{(b)} | 5,268 | Dauwagu | 7 | 98731 -98732 |
| 94.03.23 | Topiyai | ^{(b)} | ^{(b)} | 10,080 | Obaipugaida | 10 | 98734 |
| 94.03.02 | Paniai Barat (West Paniai) | 1,314.58 | 28,877 | 13,522 | Obano | 13 ^{(c)} | 98723 |
| 94.03.07 | Siriwo | 1,307.00 | 6,364 | 16,203 | Siriwo | 14 | 98724 |
| 94.03.14 | Muye | ^{(b)} | ^{(b)} | 2,098 | Muyetadi | 10 | 98721 |
| 94.03.15 | Nakama | ^{(b)} | ^{(b)} | 8,685 | Okaitadi | 7 | 98722 |
| 95.03.16 | Teluk Deya (Deya Bay) | ^{(b)} | ^{(b)} | 10,643 | Ukauwo | 6 | 98727 |
| 94.03.04 | Bogobaida | 130.84 | 11,455 | 11,718 | Bogobaida | 9 | 98736 |
| 94.03.18 | Youtadi | ^{(b)} | ^{(b)} | 10,186 | Youtadi | 6 | 98737 |
| 94.03.19 | Baya Biru | ^{(b)} | ^{(b)} | 16,611 | Bayabiru | 6 | 98735 |
| | Totals | | | | | | |

Note (a) including two kelurahan - the towns of Enarotali and Timida. (b) The fourteen new districts created since 2013 are: Aweida, Baya Biru, Deiyai Miyo, Dogomo, Fajar Timur (East Fajar), Muye, Nakama, Pugo Dagi, Teluk Deya (Deya Bay), Topiyai, Wege Bino, Wege Muka, Yagai and Youtadi. Their areas and populations as at 2010 are included with the figures for the original districts from which they were cut out subsequently. (c) including one kelurahan - the district admin centre.
