= Manokwari =

Capital district of West Papua, Indonesia

- Town
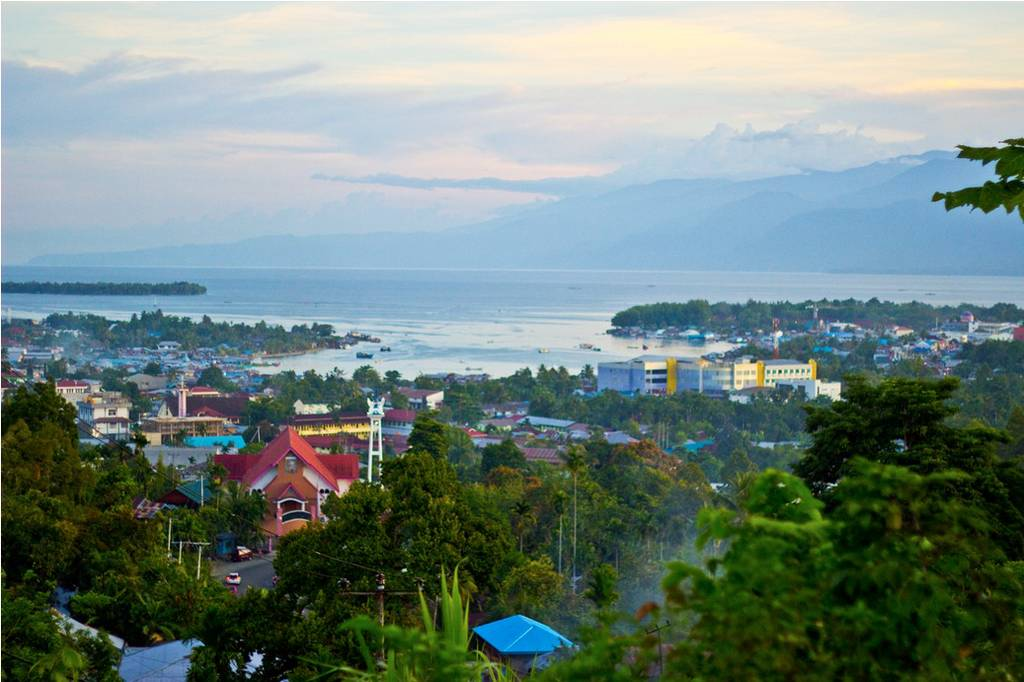
- Manokwari, as seen from the summit of Table Mountain

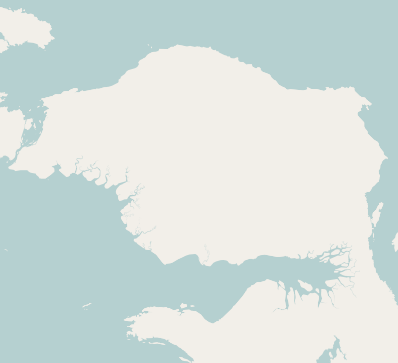
- Location in Bird's Head Peninsula, Western New Guinea and Indonesia Manokwari (Western New Guinea) Manokwari (Indonesia)
- Coordinates: 0°52′S 134°05′E
- Country: Indonesia
- Province: West Papua
- Regency: Manokwari Regency
- Districts: West Manokwari; East Manokwari

Area
  - Total: 114.3 km^{2} (44.1 sq mi)
- Elevation: 37 m (121 ft)

Population (2024)
  - Total: 132,300
  - Density: 1,157/km^{2} (2,998/sq mi)
- Time zone: UTC+9 (Indonesia Eastern Time)
- Area code: (+62) 986

Manokwari is the capital and largest town of the Indonesian province of West Papua. It is one of only seven provincial capitals of Indonesia without a city status. It is also the administrative seat of Manokwari Regency. Under proposals under consideration by the Indonesian Parliament, it was planned to split Manokwari town off from the regency and turn it into a separate city; however this process has been suspended in the light of the Government moratorium since 2013 on the creation of new regencies and cities. The majority of Manokwari residents are Christians and the town is one of the seats of the Roman Catholic Diocese of Manokwari–Sorong. The town was formerly known by Europeans as Dory, Doréry or Dorey, referring to the Doreri Bay.

== Administration ==
The town of Manokwari comprises the two separate administrative districts (distrik) of West Manokwari and East Manokwari currently within Manokwari Regency. The two districts are sub-divided into 7 urban villages (kelurahan) and 11 rural villages (desa), listed below with their areas and their populations as at mid 2023 (for West Manokwari District) and 2024 (for East Manokwari District). The 7 kelurahan are the 6 listed first for West Manokwari District, plus Pasir Putih in East Manokwari District; note that the villages (kelurahan) of West Manokwari and East Manokwari are both within West Manokwari District, and the latter is not in East Manokwari District.

Kode Wilayah	Name of Kelurahan or desa	Area in km^{2}	Pop'n Estimate mid 2023
92.02.12.1001	Manokwari Barat (West Manokwari)	6.02	23,682
92.02.12.1002	Sanggeng	1.82	13,649
92.02.12.1003	Wosi	4.06	24,877
92.02.12.1004	Amban	17.44	15,172
92.02.12.1005	Padarni	2.21	10,112
92.02.12.1006	Manokwari Timur (East Manokwari)	2.70	7,430
92.02.12.2007	Udopi	9.77	644
92.02.12.2008	Inggramui	6.73	753
92.02.12.2009	Soribo	10.06	1,205
92.02.12.2010	Tanah Merah Indah	7.29	178
Sub-totals	West Manokwari District	68.10	97,702
92.02.13.2002	Mansinam (island) ^{(a)}	4.86	1,182
92.02.13.1001	Pasir Putih (kelurahan)	4.54	5,893
92.02.13.2005	Arowi	0.99	3,204
92.02.13.2004	Bakaro	2.25	833
92.02.13.2006	Aipiri	2.10	592
92.02.13.2007	Susweni	5.59	971
92.02.13.2003	Ayambori	2.61	1,115
Sub-totals	East Manokwari District	22.97	13,790

Note: (a) comprises Mansinam and Lemon offshore islands, to the south of the urban area.

The built-up urban area continues south along the coast from West Manokwari to include the kelurahan of Sowi and increasingly the kelurahan of Anday, both in the otherwise rural South Manokwari District. Sowi (92.02.15.1001) covers 15.40 km^{2} and had 12,689 inhabitants in mid 2024. Anday (92.02.15.1002) covers 7.83 km^{2} and had 8,147 inhabitants in mid 2024. With their inclusion the area of the town would amount to 114.3 kn^{2} and its population to about 132,300.

== History ==
Trade between the natives of the region and Southeast Asians probably began around the 15th century or even earlier. Possibly via Moluccan and Malay influence, some local chiefs of the town had adopted Islam by the 19th century.

The harbour was visited by the British navigator Thomas Forrest in January 1775 on his ship Tartar. He described large houses built on posts over the water at the edge of the shore.

The French naturalist René Lesson visited Manokwari in 1824. He was serving as a surgeon and naturalist on the ship Astrolabe that was captained by Louis-Isidore Duperrey during a circumnavigation of the world (1822-1825). Lesson, in his account of the voyage, describes the vegetation and wildlife in the surrounding countryside.

On 25 October 1793, Captain John Hayes in the merchant ships Duke of Clarence and Duchess raised the British flag at Dore Bay, which he called Restoration Bay (as he had put in there to restore his crews' health) and claimed it and the surrounding area, which he called New Albion, for Great Britain. The British established a small settlement there to engage in the spice trade, especially in massoy bark and nutmeg. The British erected a small stockade fort, Fort Coronation, named in honour of King George III's coronation. For a variety of reasons the British East India Company, including changing priorities consequent on the outbreak of war with France, did not support the settlement. The settlement was not a success and in 1795 the British abandoned it.

In 1855, the first Christian mission was established in the town by German missionaries. However, it was not until the 20th century the majority of the locals converted to Christianity.

The naturalist Alfred Russel Wallace stayed in Manokwari (which he knew as Dorey) from March to July 1858 collecting natural history specimens for the British Museum in London.

On 12 April 1942, a Japanese convoy steamed into Dore Bay and began landing approximately 4,000 men. The area was already well known to the Japanese, as the area was the location of a cotton plantation developed by the government-sponsored Nan’yō Kōhatsu development company in the early 1930s. At the beginning of 1942, the Royal Netherlands East Indies Army (KNIL) garrison at Manokwari consisted of approximately 125 KNIL troops, which included several civilian reservists and home guards who had been called up at the start of February 1942. As the KNIL ground force had no chance of successfully engaging the Japanese invasion force, it withdrew into the interior of Dutch New Guinea and initiated guerilla warfare.

At 4:43 am on 4 January 2009 a magnitude 7.6 earthquake struck Manokwari. Felt as far away as Australia, the 35 km deep earthquake killed four people, injured 19 more, and 167,000 people were left without power. Residents were evacuated to Manokwari Military Academy to seek shelter from possible tsunamis and aftershocks that were felt throughout the day. Damage occurred to the Mutiara Hotel, the Naval Hospital, and several other buildings. Manokwari Regional Airport had significant damage, being closest to the epicenter, and all four deaths resulted there. The Indonesian government sent a team of seven doctors to Manokwari to assist with the injured. Originally, the team was projected to be ten people, but due to the severe damage to the runway, only seven were able to be transported. This was not unlike the previous quakes on 10 October 2002 when another 7.6 magnitude quake shook the region. In 1996 similar quakes also halted progress in the local region but there is no record of the recorded magnitude.

On 14 April 2010, Merpati Nusantara Airlines flight MZ 836, a Boeing 737-300 (registration PK-MDF) with 103 persons on board, broke into pieces as it bounced off the tarmac at Rendani Airport near Manokwari after landing in poor weather. The tail of the aircraft broke off and came to rest in the creek off the northern end of Runway 35. All passengers survived, but 21 injured people were admitted to hospital. The flight originated in Sorong, West Papua.

On 21 August 2019, Manokwari experienced a violent protest that saw the provincial legislature building torched, with the protest being part of the 2019 Papua protests.

== Climate ==
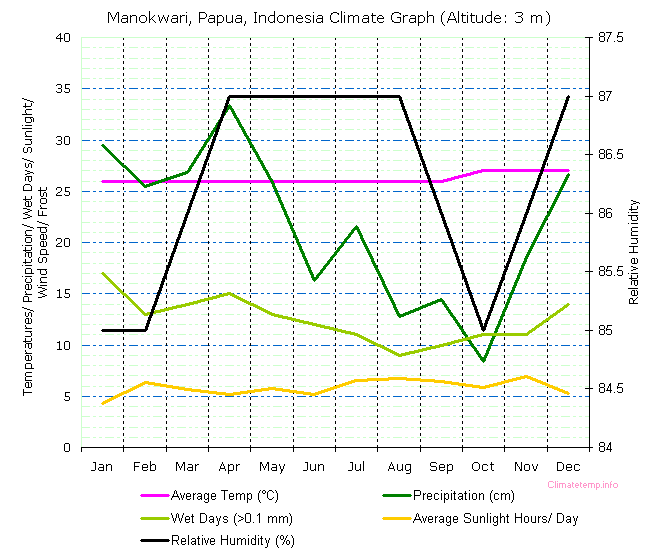
Manokwari monthly climate chart

Manokwari is a coastal town three metres above sea level on the coast of West Papua. Its average temperature is 26.3 °C (79.3 °F) and its temperature fluctuation is only 1 °C. It receives 2,597 mm (102.2 in) of rain per year, approximately 216 mm (8.5 in) per month. It is located 52 minutes (0.87 degrees, slightly less than 100 km) south of the equator and has an 86.3% average humidity. The annual sunshine hours are 2127; an average of 5.8 hours of sunlight per day. To date, there are no recorded days of frost or snowfall in Manokwari.

Climate data for Manokwari, West Papua, Indonesia (193 m asl)
Month	Jan	Feb	Mar	Apr	May	Jun	Jul	Aug	Sep	Oct	Nov	Dec	Year
Mean daily maximum °C (°F)	29.9 (85.8)	29.6 (85.3)	29.6 (85.3)	30.0 (86.0)	30.1 (86.2)	29.7 (85.5)	29.4 (84.9)	29.3 (84.7)	29.8 (85.6)	30.5 (86.9)	30.5 (86.9)	30.3 (86.5)	29.9 (85.8)
Daily mean °C (°F)	25.9 (78.6)	25.9 (78.6)	25.9 (78.6)	26.1 (79.0)	26.2 (79.2)	25.9 (78.6)	25.6 (78.1)	25.4 (77.7)	25.7 (78.3)	26.2 (79.2)	26.3 (79.3)	26.2 (79.2)	25.9 (78.7)
Mean daily minimum °C (°F)	21.9 (71.4)	22.2 (72.0)	22.3 (72.1)	22.3 (72.1)	22.3 (72.1)	22.1 (71.8)	21.8 (71.2)	21.6 (70.9)	21.7 (71.1)	21.9 (71.4)	22.1 (71.8)	22.1 (71.8)	22.0 (71.6)
Average precipitation mm (inches)	264 (10.4)	247 (9.7)	296 (11.7)	304 (12.0)	210 (8.3)	198 (7.8)	160 (6.3)	167 (6.6)	140 (5.5)	122 (4.8)	141 (5.6)	266 (10.5)	2,515 (99.2)
Average relative humidity (%)	86	85	86	86	86	85	87	87	86	84	85	86	86
Source 1: Climate-Data.org (temp & precip)
Source 2: Weatherbase (humidity)

== Demographic information ==
Drawing of a Doreri man with a korwar statue, 1858

There are several different tribal groups living in Manokwari by virtue of it being the capital of the province. The prominent tribal groups of Manokwari are the Hattam, Moile, Sough, and Meyah, collectively identified as the Arfak people, although they speak unrelated languages. Manokwari is traditionally located in Meyah territory close to the border with Hattam. Among the other tribes of the region are the Mansim Borai, sometimes considered a sub-tribe of Hattam due to them speaking a related language, and the Numfor Doreri living on the islands off the coast of Manokwari, more closely related to people of the Biak Islands to the west.

== Education ==
The State University of Papua was established on 3 November 2000. This university was created to help with the local education of the people of Papua. Among their achievements is the Beccariana, an academic journal published by the university. This publication contains all the research done by the university in the field of herbalism. The university is strategically located on a hill facing the town, surrounded by a dense tropical rainforest. This allows the researchers instant access to the biological samples and case studies.

== Sister cities ==
Sister cities of Manokwari are:

City	Country
Podgorica	Montenegro
Thimphu	Bhutan

== Derived name ==
The land flatworm Platydemus manokwari was named after the town (where it was found) by French zoologist de Beauchamp in 1962.

== Tourism ==
One tourist site is the white, sandy Doreri Bay Beach which has calm, shallow water and is very safe for swimming. Arfak Range Nature Reserve in the south of Manokwari is a popular tourist destination for visitors who are interested in hiking, birding, and wildlife watching. The tropical rainforest that covers most of the mountains is the natural habitat of various species of animals including cuscus possum, lesser birds of paradise, common paradise kingfisher, magnificent riflebird as well as king bird of paradise. Susnguakti forest located in the south of the town is a popular destination for nature lovers who like camping and seeing the bio-diversity of the montane forest. Charles Roring is a tourist guide who regularly organizes birds of paradise and wildlife-watching tours to the Susnguakti forest of Manokwari.

== Transport ==
=== Roads ===
Manokwari has a road to connect the town center, port and airport.

=== Sea ===
Manokwari Port on Banjarmasin Street operates 24 hours a day.

=== Air ===
Manokwari is served by Rendani Airport, which is about 5 km from downtown Manokwari.
