= Manokwari Regency =

Regency in West Papua, Indonesia

Manokwari Regency Kabupaten Manokwari
- Regency
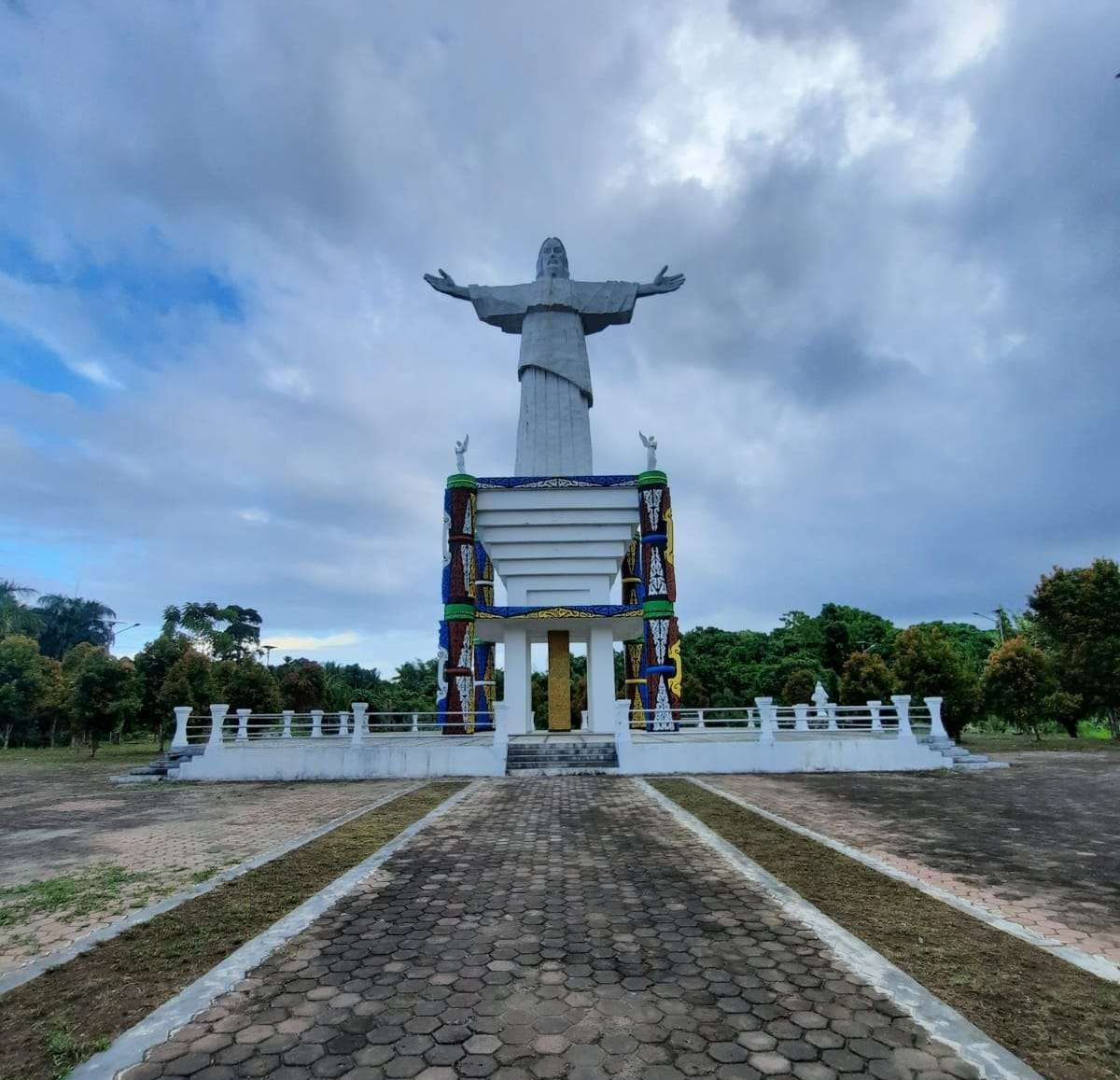
- Statue of Jesus on Mansinam Island

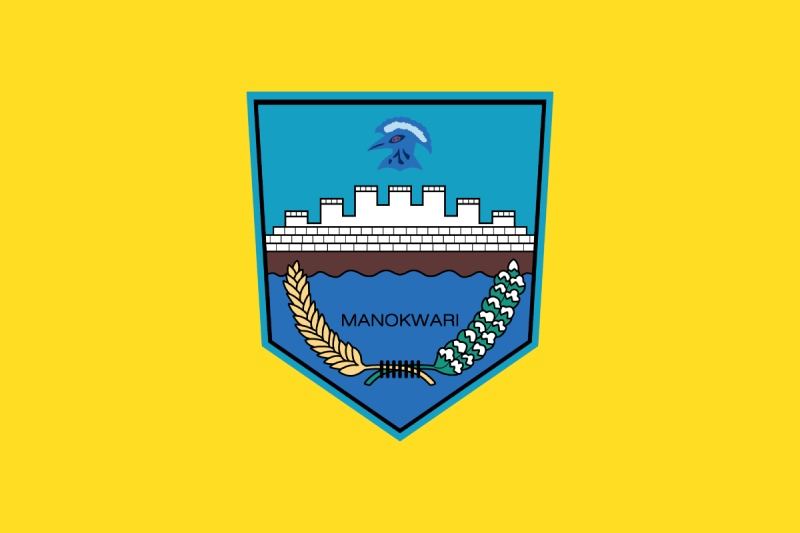
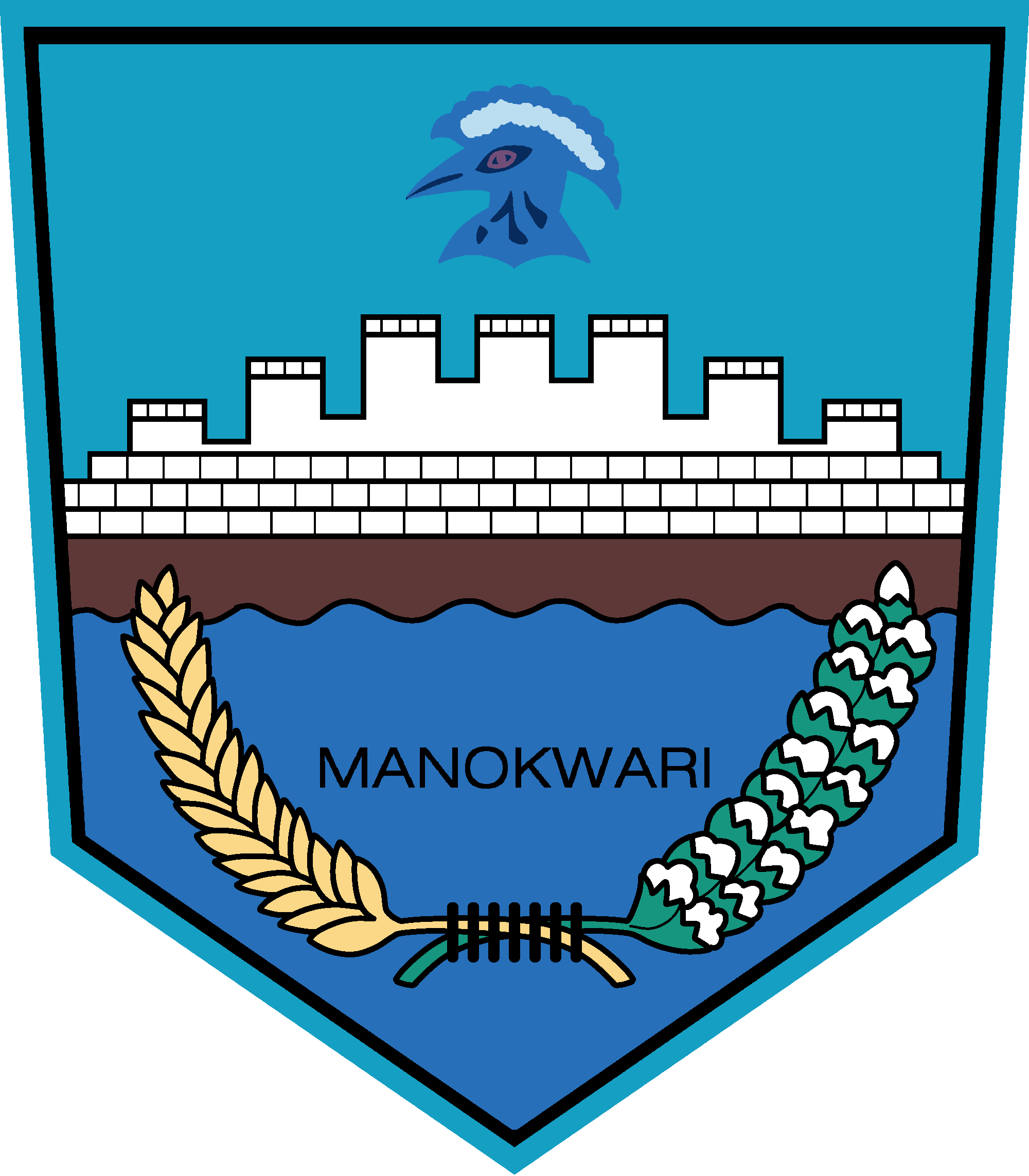
- Flag Coat of arms

- Location in West Papua

- Location in Indonesia
- Coordinates: 0.8629°S 134.0640°E
- Country: Indonesia
- Province: West Papua
- Regency seat: Manokwari

Government
  - Regent: Hermus Indou (PDI-P)
  - Vice Regent: Edi Budoyo
  - Legislature: Manokwari Regency House of Representatives

Area
  - Total: 2,763.02 km^{2} (1,066.81 sq mi)

Population (mid 2024 estimate)
  - Total: 204,106
  - Density: 73/km^{2} (190/sq mi)
- Time zone: UTC+9 (IEST)
- Area code: (+62) 986
- Website: manokwarikab.go.id

Manokwari Regency is a regency in West Papua, Indonesia. Following the splitting away of twenty of its former districts in 2013, it now covers an area of 2,763.02 km^{2} and had a population of 192,663 at the 2020 Census; the official estimate as of mid-2024 was 204,106 (comprising 105,435 males and 98,671 females). The administrative centre (regency seat) is presently at the town of Manokwari, which is also the capital of the province.

Under proposals approved by the Indonesian Parliament in 2013, the town of Manokwari - comprising the districts (kecamatan) of West Manokwari and East Manokwari - was intended to be split off from the regency to form a separate independent city, but the proposal has subsequently remained under consideration with a decision deferred by the Indonesian Government (which has held a moratorium on the formation of new regencies and cities).

== Administration ==
At the 2010 Census, Manokwari Regency comprised 29 districts (kecamatan) with an area of 34,970 km^{2} and a 2010 Census population of 187,726, but in 2013 two new regencies - South Manokwari Regency (Manokwari Selatan) with six districts, and Arfak Mountains Regency (Pegunungan Arfak) with ten districts - were created from parts of the Manokwari Regency, while the most westerly four districts (Kebar, Amberbaken, Mubrani and Senopi, which were the largest in area of the remaining districts, although sparsely populated) were removed from Manokwari Regency and added to the Tambrauw Regency.

The residual area of Manokwari Regency thus comprised nine districts, listed below with their areas and their populations at the 2010 Census and the 2020 Census, together with the official estimates as of mid-2024. The table also includes the location of the district centres, the number of administrative villages in each district (totaling 164 rural kampung and 9 urban kelurahan), and its postal code.

Kode Kemendagri	Name of District (distrik)	Area in km^{2}	Pop'n Census 2010	Pop'n Census 2020	Pop'n Estimate mid 2024	Admin centre	No. of villages	Post code
92.02.03	Warmare	539.70	6,192	8,993	9,709	Dindey	31	98317
92.02.04	Prafi	280.14	14,240	17,783	19,351	Udapi Hilir	16	98316 ^{(a)}
92.02.12	Manokwari Barat (West Manokwari)	68.10	74,996	95,837	97,470	Sanggeng	10 ^{(b)}	98312 ^{(c)}
92.02.13	Manokwari Timur ^{(d)} (East Manokwari)	22.97	8,988	12,735	13,790	Pasir Putih	7 ^{(e)}	98311 ^{(f)}
92.02.14	Manokwari Utara ^{(g)} (North Manokwari)	328.73	2,248	4,191	4,363	Lebau	22	98314
92.02.15	Manokwari Selatan ^{(h)} (South Manokwari)	226.79	13,256	25,239	30,420	Anday	18 ^{(i)}	98313
92.02.17	Tanah Rubuh	201.61	2,114	3,817	4,254	Warkapi	24	98315
92.02.05	Masni	625.13	13,540	17,485	18,520	Sumber Boga	33	98318
92.02.21	Sidey	468.94	4,390	6,583	6,529	Sidey	12	98319
	Total	2,763.02	139,964	192,663	204,106		173	

Notes: (a) except for the village of Mebji, with a post code of 98315.
(b) comprising 6 kelurahan (Amban, Manokwari Barat, Manokwari Timur, Padarni, Sanggeng and Wosi) and 4 desa.
(c) except for the two kelurahan of Manokwari Timur (with a post code of 98311) and Amban (with a post code of 98314).
(d) includes the offshore islands of Pulau Lemon and Pulau Mansinam. (e) includes the kelurahan of Pasir Putih.
(f) except for the two villages of Arowi and Pasir Putih (with a post code of 98313).
(g) includes the offshore islands of Pulau Irbor, Pulau Irbor Utara, Pulau Kaki and Pulau Waisupi. (h) includes the offshore island of Pulau Raimuti.
(i) including 2 kelurahan - Anday (with 8,147 inhabitants at mid 2024) and Sowi (with 12,689 inhabitants at mid 2024) - which both lie in the south of the built-up area of Manokwari town.
