= Dofari =

Dofari دفاري
- Village
- Location within Iran
- Coordinates: 26°57′15″N 56°12′27″E
- Country: Iran
- Province: Hormozgan
- County: Qeshm
- Bakhsh: Central
- Rural District: Howmeh

Population (2006)
  - Total: 138
- Time zone: UTC+3:30 (IRST)
  - Summer (DST): UTC+4:30 (IRDT)

Dofari (Persian: دفاري, also Romanized as Dofārī; also known as Dafūrī, De Fowrī, Deh Fārī, and Dowfūrī) is a village in Howmeh Rural District, in the Central District of Qeshm County, Hormozgan Province, Iran. At the 2006 census, its population was 138, in 35 families.
