= Bagh-e Bala, Hormozgan =

Bagh-e Bala باغ بالا
- Village
- Location within Iran
- Coordinates: 26°52′57″N 56°01′57″E
- Country: Iran
- Province: Hormozgan
- County: Qeshm
- Bakhsh: Central
- Rural District: Ramkan

Population (2006)
  - Total: 202
- Time zone: UTC+3:30 (IRST)
  - Summer (DST): UTC+4:30 (IRDT)

Bagh-e Bala (Persian: باغ بالا, also Romanized as Bāgh-e Bālā and Bāgh Bālā) is a village in Ramkan Rural District, in the Central District of Qeshm County, Hormozgan Province, Iran. At the 2006 census, its population was 202, in 42 families.
