= Laft-e Kohneh =

Laft-e Kohneh لافت كهنه
- Village
- Location within Iran
- Coordinates: 26°56′54″N 55°45′34″E
- Country: Iran
- Province: Hormozgan
- County: Qeshm
- Bakhsh: Central
- Rural District: Howmeh

Population (2006)
  - Total: 117
- Time zone: UTC+3:30 (IRST)
  - Summer (DST): UTC+4:30 (IRDT)

Laft-e Kohneh (Persian: لافت كهنه, also Romanized as Lāft-e Kohneh and Laft Kohneh; also known as Lāf Kohneh) is a village in Howmeh Rural District, in the Central District of Qeshm County, Hormozgan Province, Iran. At the 2006 census, its population was 117, in 9 families.
