= Pey Posht =

Pey Posht پي پشت
- Village
- Location within Iran
- Coordinates: 26°52′48″N 55°55′37″E
- Country: Iran
- Province: Hormozgan
- County: Qeshm
- Bakhsh: Central
- Rural District: Ramkan

Population (2006)
  - Total: 1,766
- Time zone: UTC+3:30 (IRST)
  - Summer (DST): UTC+4:30 (IRDT)

Pey Posht (Persian: پي پشت, also Romanized as Peyposht and Pey-ye Posht; also known as Payi Pusht) is a village in Ramkan Rural District, in the Central District of Qeshm County, Hormozgan Province, Iran. At the 2006 census, its population was 1,766, in 446 families.
