= Bangali, Iran =

Bangali بنگالي
- Village
- Location within Iran
- Coordinates: 26°51′58″N 55°57′54″E
- Country: Iran
- Province: Hormozgan
- County: Qeshm
- Bakhsh: Central
- Rural District: Ramkan

Population (2006)
  - Total: 109
- Time zone: UTC+3:30 (IRST)
  - Summer (DST): UTC+4:30 (IRDT)

Bangali (Persian: بنگالي, also Romanized as Bangālī) is a village in Ramkan Rural District, in the Central District of Qeshm County, Hormozgan Province, Iran. At the 2006 census, its population was 109, in 23 families.
