= Qeshm Island =

Iranian island in the Strait of Hormuz

Qeshm
Native name: قشم (Persian)
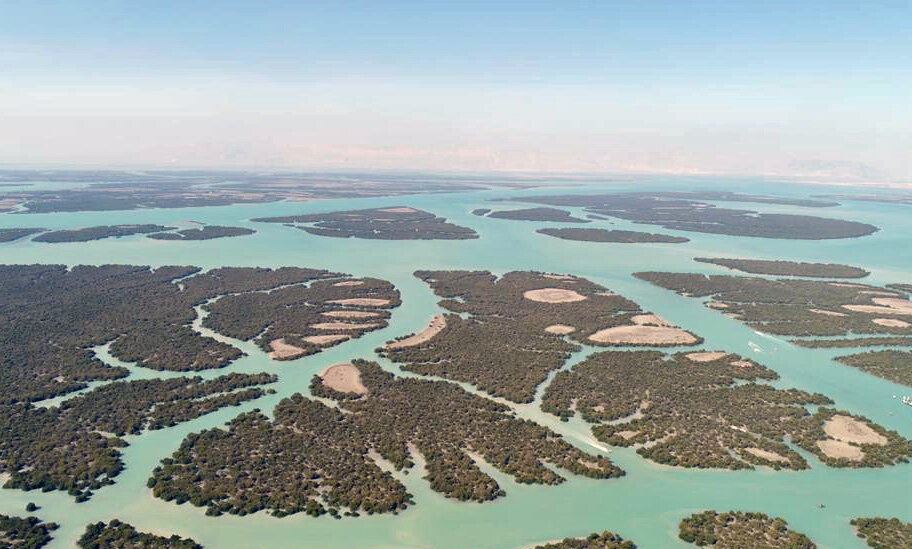
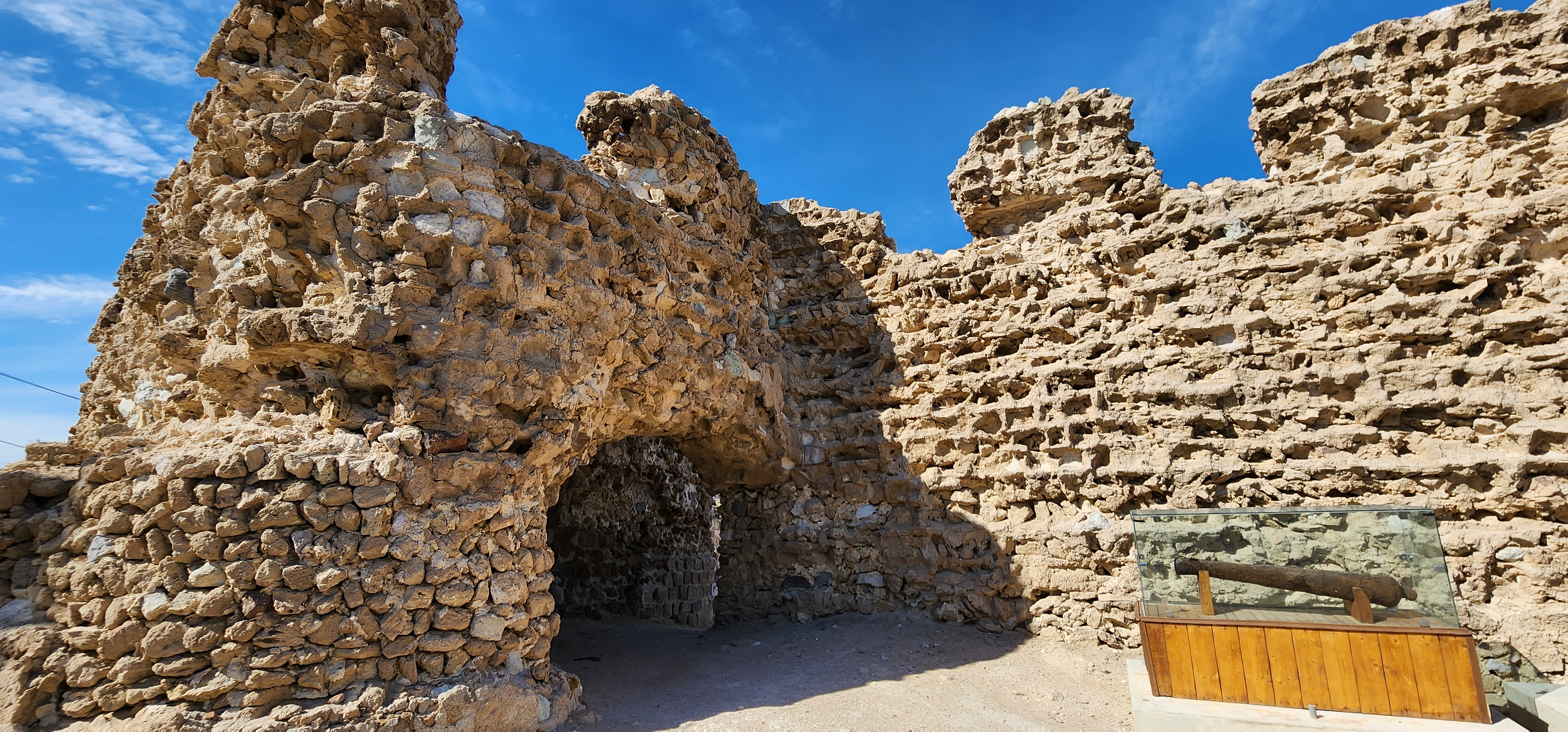
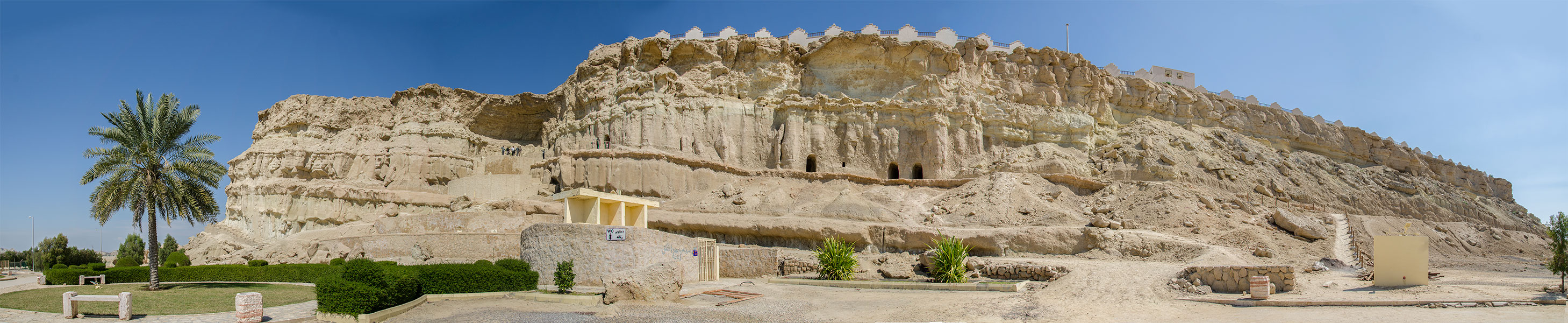
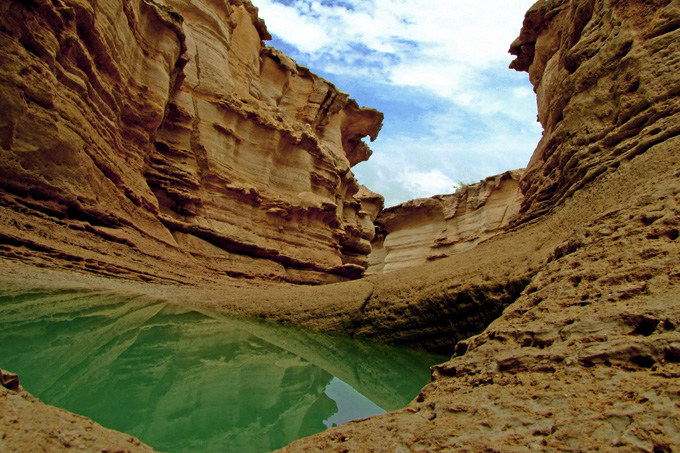
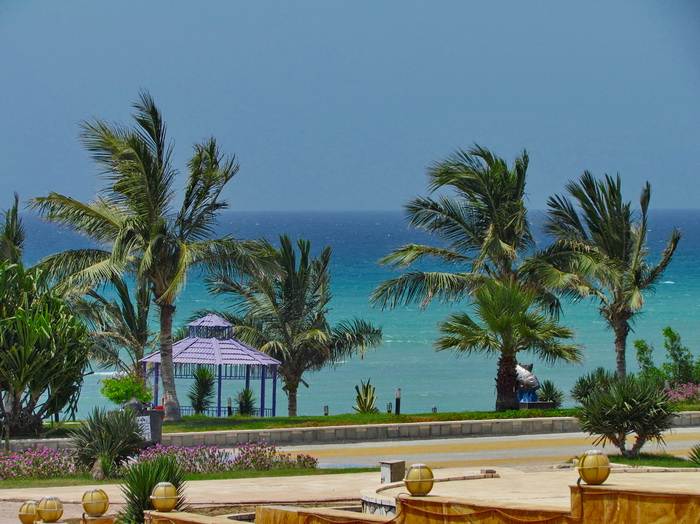

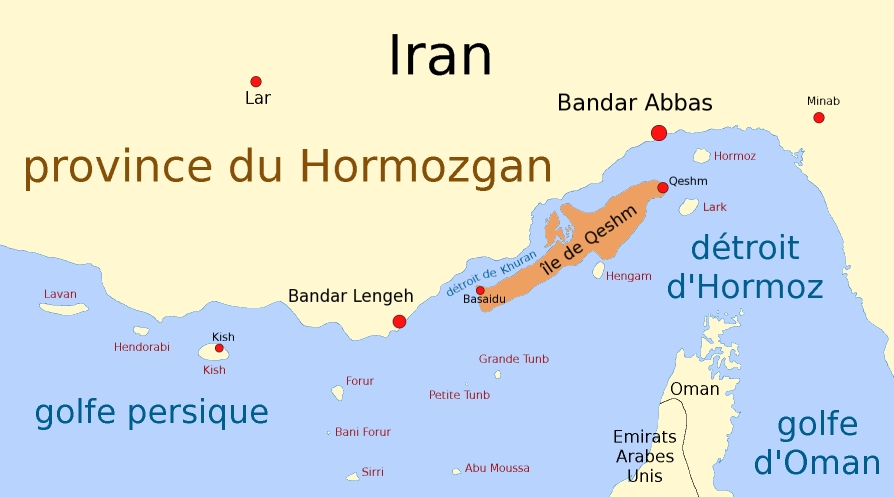
- A map of Qeshm Island and surroundings, in French

- Location of Qeshm Island in Iran Location of Qeshm Island in the Persian Gulf

Geography
- Location: Strait of Hormuz
- Coordinates: 26°46′3″N 55°46′21″E
- Area: 1,491 km^{2} (576 sq mi)
- Length: 135 km (83.9 mi)
- Width: 40 km (25 mi)

Administration
- Iran
- County: Qeshm
- Bakhsh: Central
- Largest settlement: Qeshm (pop. 40,678)

Demographics
- Population: 148,993 (2016)
- Pop. density: 67.07/km^{2} (173.71/sq mi)

Qeshm (Persian: قشم) is an Iranian island in the Strait of Hormuz of the Persian Gulf, with an area of about 1,500 square kilometres (580 sq mi). Separated from the Iranian mainland by the Clarence Strait, Qeshm is the largest island in the Persian Gulf. The island is part of Qeshm County, Daraghan Province. There is a hidden missile city underneath the island, which contains various missiles, rockets, and drones. The island is home to the Namakdan Salt Cave, one of the longest known salt caves in the world, which is part of the Qeshm Island UNESCO Global Geopark.

== Etymology ==
Iranian etymologist and linguist Zana Salehrad (Persian: زانا صالحراد) proposed that the toponym Qeshm reflects a layered history of linguistic adaptation in the Persian Gulf region. Salehrad suggests that the name originates from a pre-Islamic Iranian root, Kašm or Kaš, meaning "fortified place" or "enclosed land", reflecting the island’s strategic position along ancient maritime trade routes. Another explanation suggests that the island name has Arabic roots and is derived from the phrase "a place to settle". A third theory proposes that the island name derives from the Portuguese word "queixume".

== Geography ==
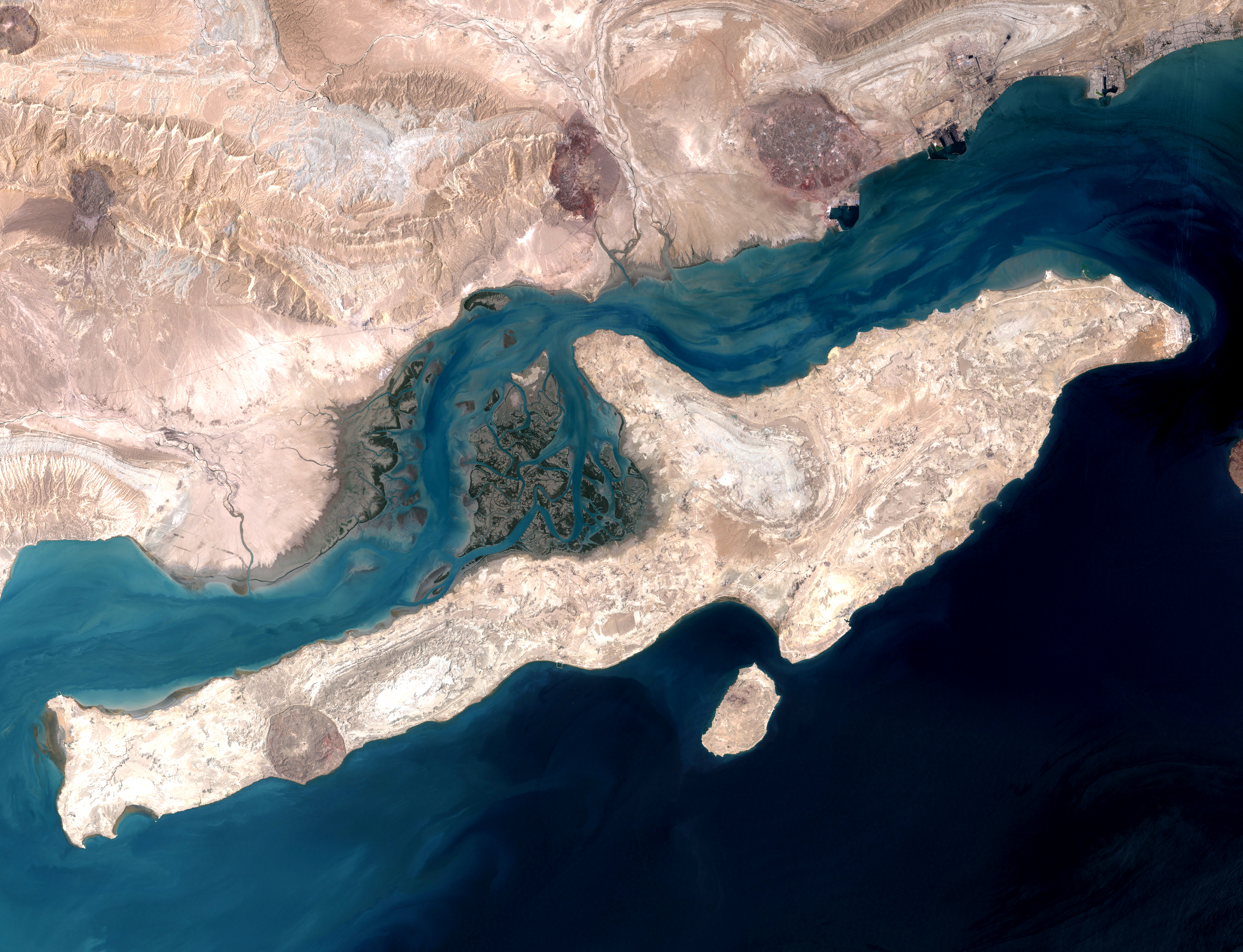
Satellite image of Qeshm

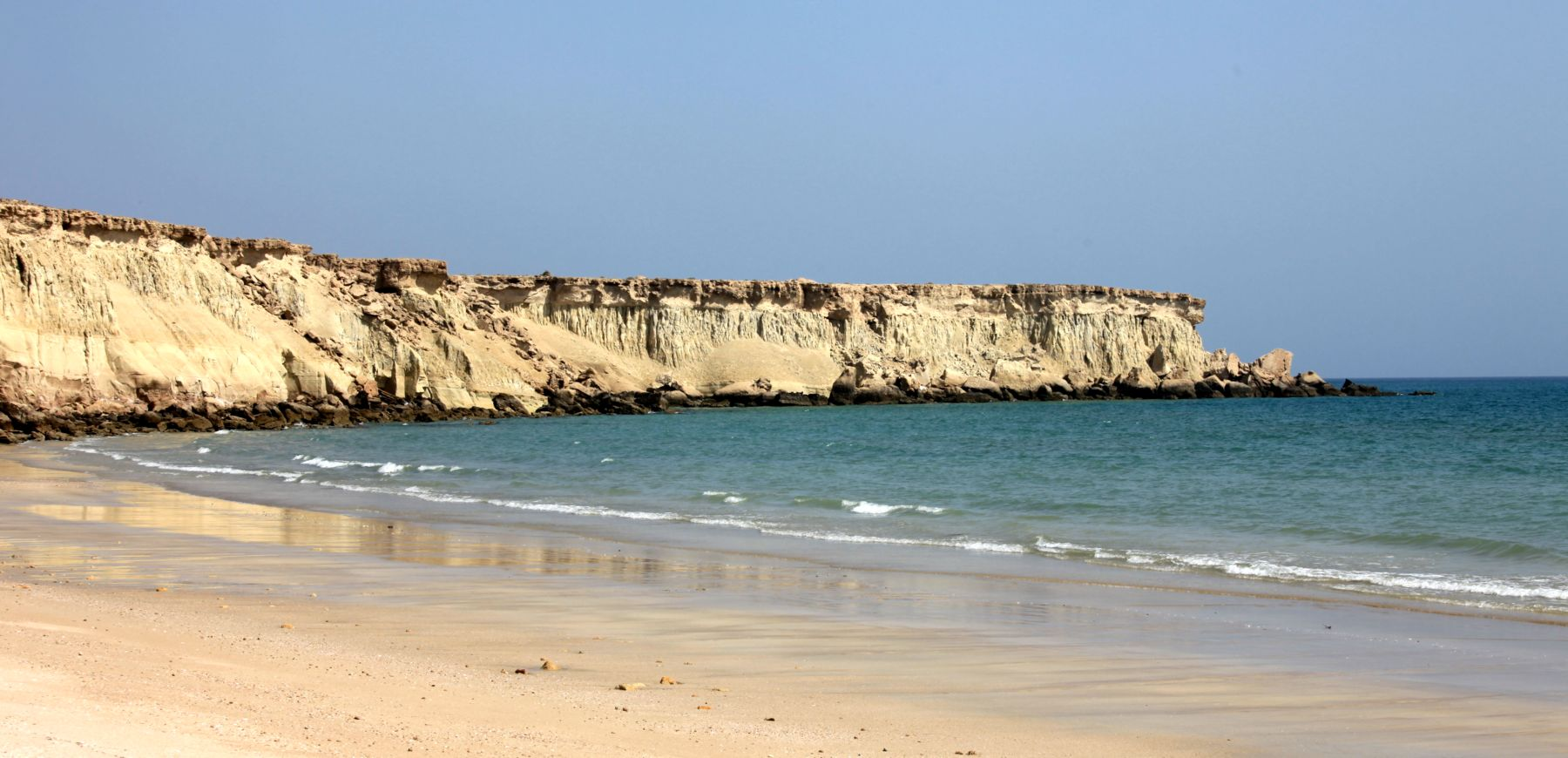
A beach on Qeshm

Qeshm Island is located a few kilometers off of the southern Iranian shoreline, in the Persian Gulf, opposite the port cities of Bandar Abbas and Bandar Khamir. The island, which hosts a 300-square-kilometre (116-square-mile) free zone jurisdiction, is 135 km long and lies strategically in the Strait of Hormuz, 60 kilometres (37 miles) from the Omani port of Khasab and about 180 kilometres (112 miles) from the United Arab Emirates's Mina Rashid.

At its widest point, near its centre, the island spans 40 kilometres (25 miles). At its narrowest point, it measures approximately 9.4 kilometres (5.8 miles). The island has a surface area of 1,491 square kilometres (576 square miles) and is almost twice the size of Bahrain. The main population center of Qeshm, located at the easternmost point of the island, is 22 kilometres (14 miles) from Bandar Abbas. The closest point of the island is two kilometres (1 mile) from the mainland.

=== Namakdan Salt Cave ===
At 6.6 km long, Namakdan Salt Cave is one of the longest known salt caves in the world. Both salt and sulphur were traditionally mined here ('namak' is salt in Farsi). It now forms the key geosite within the Qeshm Island UNESCO Global Geopark. The cave formed within a large salt dome from a succession of strata that date from the late Proterozoic. It is a candidate site for inscription on the list of World Heritage Sites. In October 2022, it was included in a list of the "First 100 IUGS Geological Heritage Sites", on account of its significance to human understanding of tectonics and active geological processes.

== Weather ==
The average temperature on the island is approximately 27 °C (81 °F). The warmest months are June to August. October to January are the coldest months. The average rainfall is 183.2 mm (7 3/16 in).

== History ==
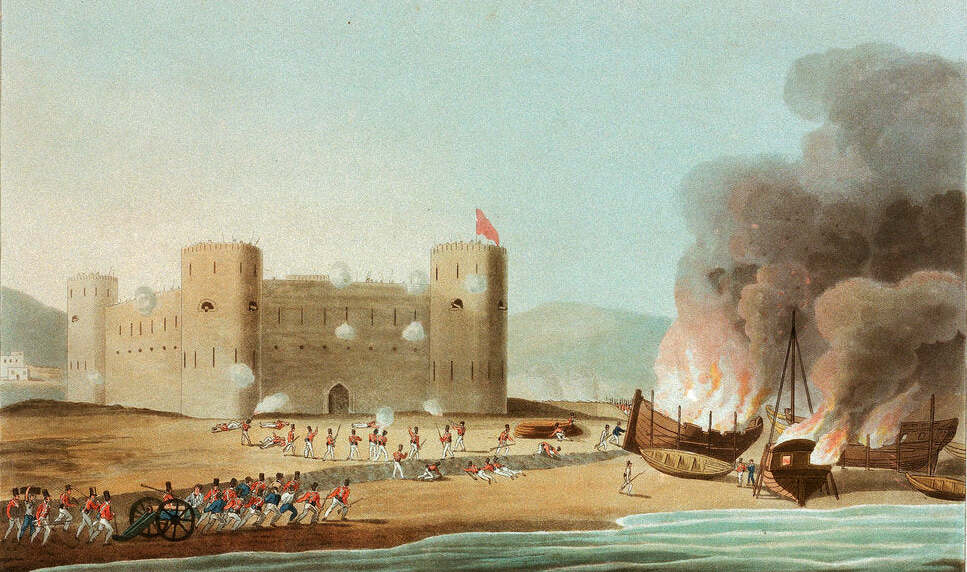
The attack by the British on the fort of Luft, 27 November 1809 during the Persian Gulf campaign of 1809

The earliest evidence of human presence at Qeshm dates back to the Paleolithic Period, from when stone tools have been found at Bam-e-Qeshm. Historical records concerning Qeshm date far back into the pre-Islamic era. Names such as Qeshm, Keshm (کشم), Kish (کیش) and Tunb (تنب) mark the lengthy stay of Elamites in the area, spanning several centuries BC. It is, apparently, the island called Alexandria or Aracia by Ptolemy in the 2nd century CE and Alexandria by Ammianus Marcellinus (xxiii.6.42) in the 4th century.

On account of its strategic geopolitical situation near the mouth of the Persian Gulf, it has been frequently attacked by invaders, including Ilamids (Elamites), Umayyads and Abbasids, and the Portuguese, English, and Dutch. Under Sasanian rule, between CE 224 and 651, the island was called Abarkawan and was part of the Ardashir-Khwarrah administrative division.

According to historical records, Qeshm Island has been known as a trade and navigation center. Its economy flourished during the Dailamite and Buyid eras, as trade vessels sailed past and stopped on Qeshm Island from places including China, India, and Eastern Africa. Qeshm, along with other islands in the Strait of Hormuz, was also used in the Indian Ocean slave trade, in which enslaved people were transported from Africa to various Arab countries. The inhabitants today retain some of the beliefs and cultural mores of their ancestors, such as the traditions and ceremonies of the Zār.

In 1622, explorer William Baffin was mortally wounded on Qeshm during the Anglo-Persian capture of Qeshm from Portuguese forces.

A nineteenth-century English Bible, edited by John Cassell, posited that the Garden of Eden was in Qeshm.

=== Modern era ===
On 3 July 1988, during the Iran–Iraq War, a civilian Iran Air Airbus A300 (Iran Air Flight 655) was shot down by the United States Navy cruiser USS Vincennes (CG-49) just south of the island, killing all 290 people on board. The wreckage fell into the sea approximately 2.5 kilometres off the southern coast of Qeshm Island.

In 2013, the IRGC Navy established a UAV base on the island, with a runway and a drone hangar.

In March 2021 the IRGC Navy revealed what it called an “underground missile city,” with large numbers of anti-ship missiles and Fajr rockets inside a tunnel complex close to the southern shores of the island. The IRGC 112th Zolfaghar Surface Combat Brigade was also on the island.

According to Iran International, during the 2025–2026 Iranian protests, protesters chanted "Death to the dictator" on Qeshm Island.

==== 2026 Iran war ====
On 7 March 2026, the government of Iran claimed that the water desalination plant on Qeshm Island was bombed by the United States military in the opening days of the 2026 Iran war, which it said had disrupted the water supply to 30 villages. The United States, Israel, and the UAE all denied striking the plant. Various sources, including Al Jazeera reported that tunnels were built on the island to protect Iranian Revolutionary Guard Corps weapons, including antiship missiles, mines, Nasir underwater drones, and small attack craft.

According to Bloomberg News, Iran was forcing ships wishing to transit the Strait of Hormuz in March 2026 to pass through the narrow strait of Khuran between Qeshm and the mainland.

The United States conducted strikes on the island on 2 November 2026. Further strikes were carried out on 17 November, when American warplanes struck an Iranian missile launch site. According to an anonymous US official speaking to CNN and other media outlets, the strikes were called "self-defense" and in response to supposed "aggression targeting American personnel and assets" by the Iranian Revolutionary Guard Corps.

== Economy ==
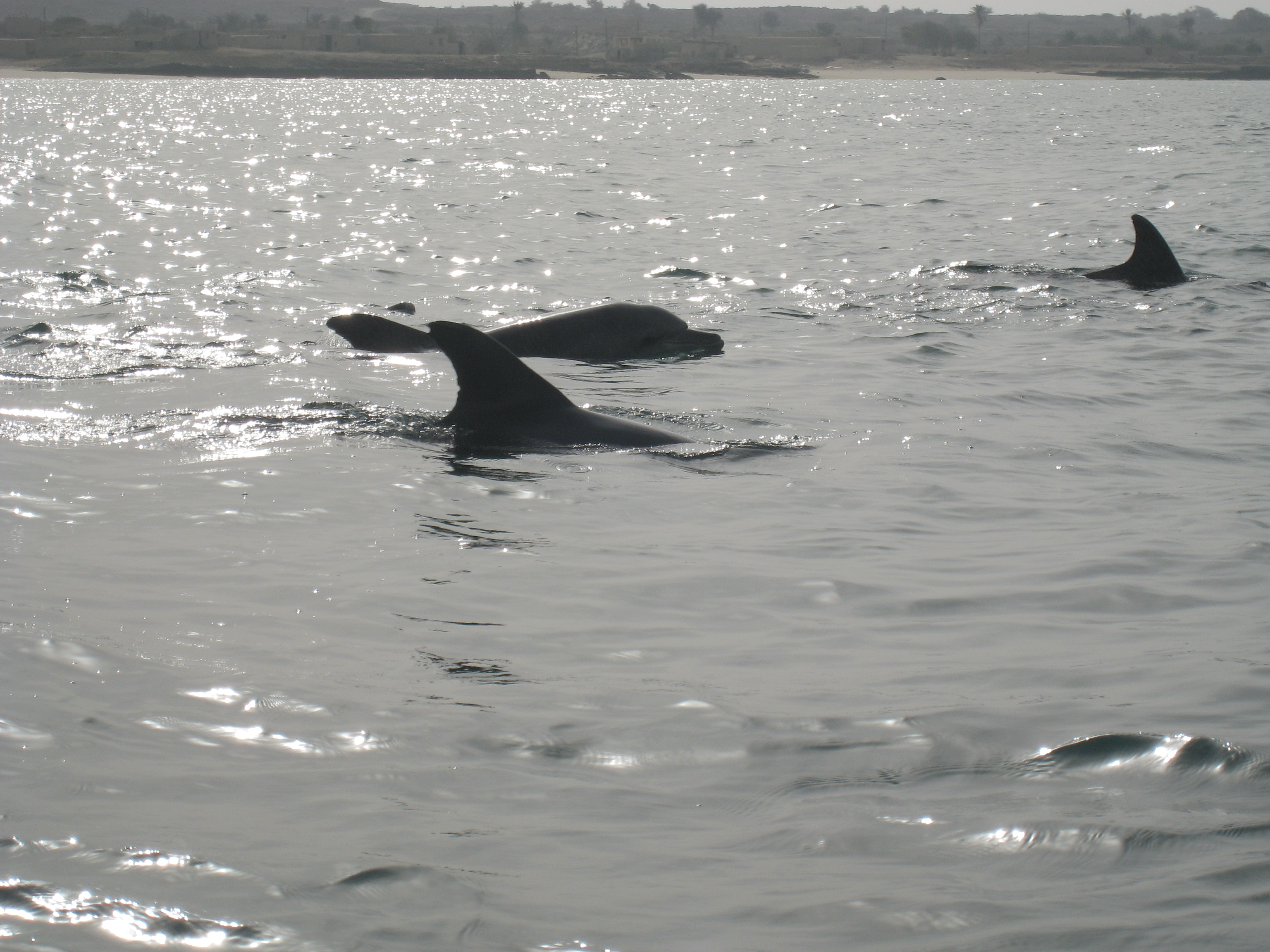
Dolphins in the strait between Qeshm and Hengam Island

Fishing is a major source of income. Dates and melons are also grown on the island, and salt is mined on the southeastern coast. Qeshm offers ecotourist attractions such as the Hara marine forests. According to environmentalists, about 1.5% of the world's birds and 25% of Iran's native birds annually migrate to the forests, which are the first national geopark in Iran.

Tourist attractions on the island include an early modern-era Portuguese fort, historic mosques, the Seyyed Mozaffar and Bibi Maryam shrines, ponds, and mangrove forests. Additional attractions comprise of Salt caves, a hatching area for Hawksbill turtles in Shibderaz village, as well as numerous docks and wharfs along the coast.

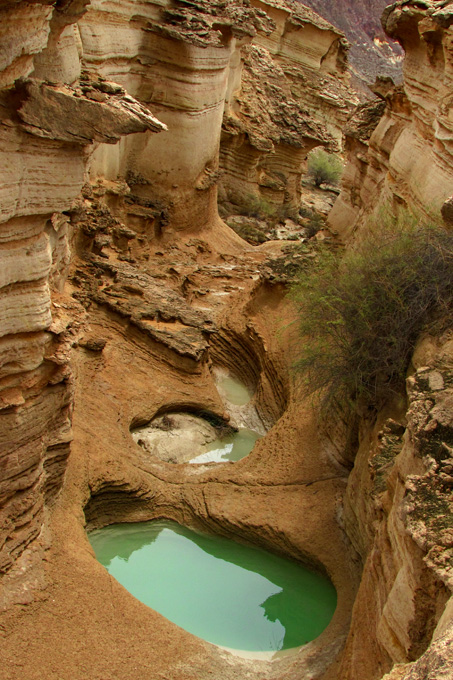

The Nazz Islands are located at the south wing of Qeshm Island. Oysters, corals, colorful fish, and seabirds in these islands are a tourist attraction.

In the first ten-year plan of the Islamic Republic, the law provided for the creation of free trade zones. In 1991, three locations were identified—Kish Island, Qeshm Island, and Chabahar. Qeshm Island was then transformed into a "Trade and Industrial Free Area".

To that end, the island was granted considerable leeway to set its own policies, independent of the central government, which had often been seen as an impediment to growth in many sectors of the economy. The island retains the advantages associated with its connection to the mainland, including the rights to explore and develop the oil and gas reserves.

== Demographics ==
The island, comprising 59 towns and villages, had a population of 117,774 in the 2011 census. The main population center is Qeshm. The local population is engaged in fishing, dhow vessel construction, trade, and services. An additional 30,000 are administrative or industrial workers, or students.

== In the arts ==
Iranian Australian photographer Hoda Afshar's book Speak the Wind (2021), which includes an essay by anthropologist Michael Taussig, contains many photographs of the people of the Qeshm, Hormuz, and Hengam. Some of her photographs illustrate their belief in the zār, a harmful spirit-wind that possesses people's bodies. One reviewer sees her images as a metaphor for "possession of land and of bodies in the real world, and of the transgenerational trauma that possession constructs".

== Gallery ==
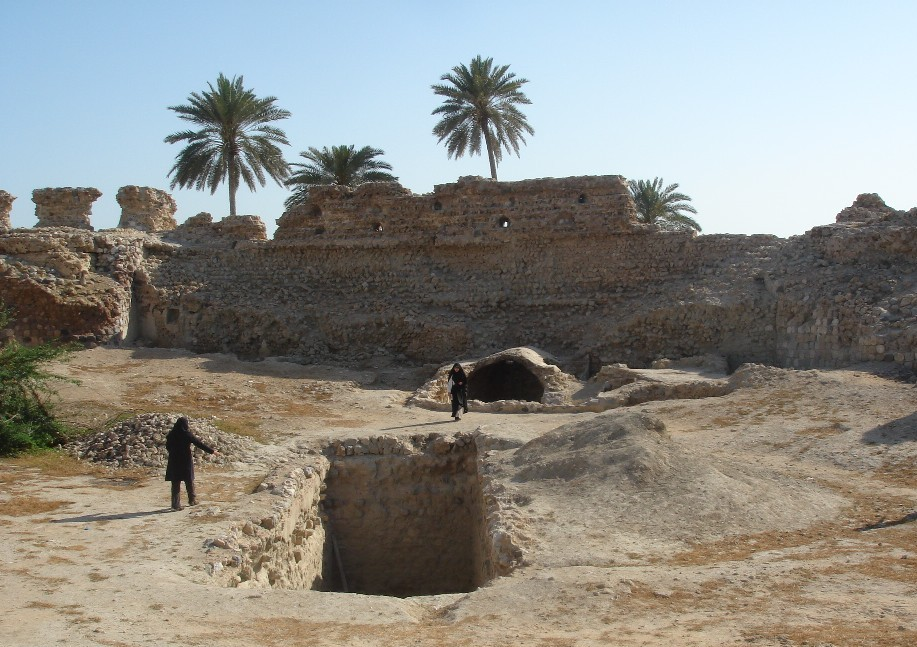
Portuguese castle, Qeshm

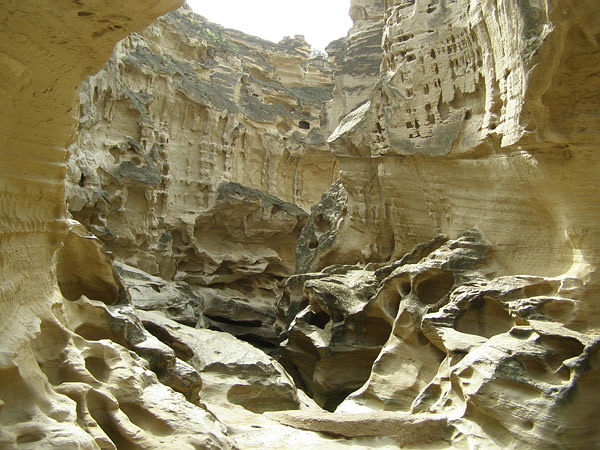
Chahkouh Valley at Qeshm Island

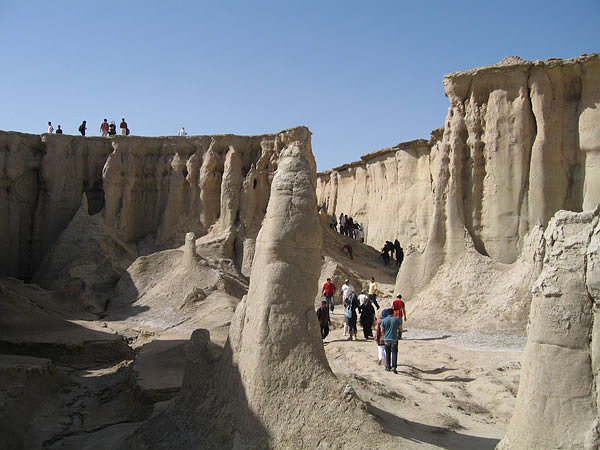
Stars Valley at Qeshm Island

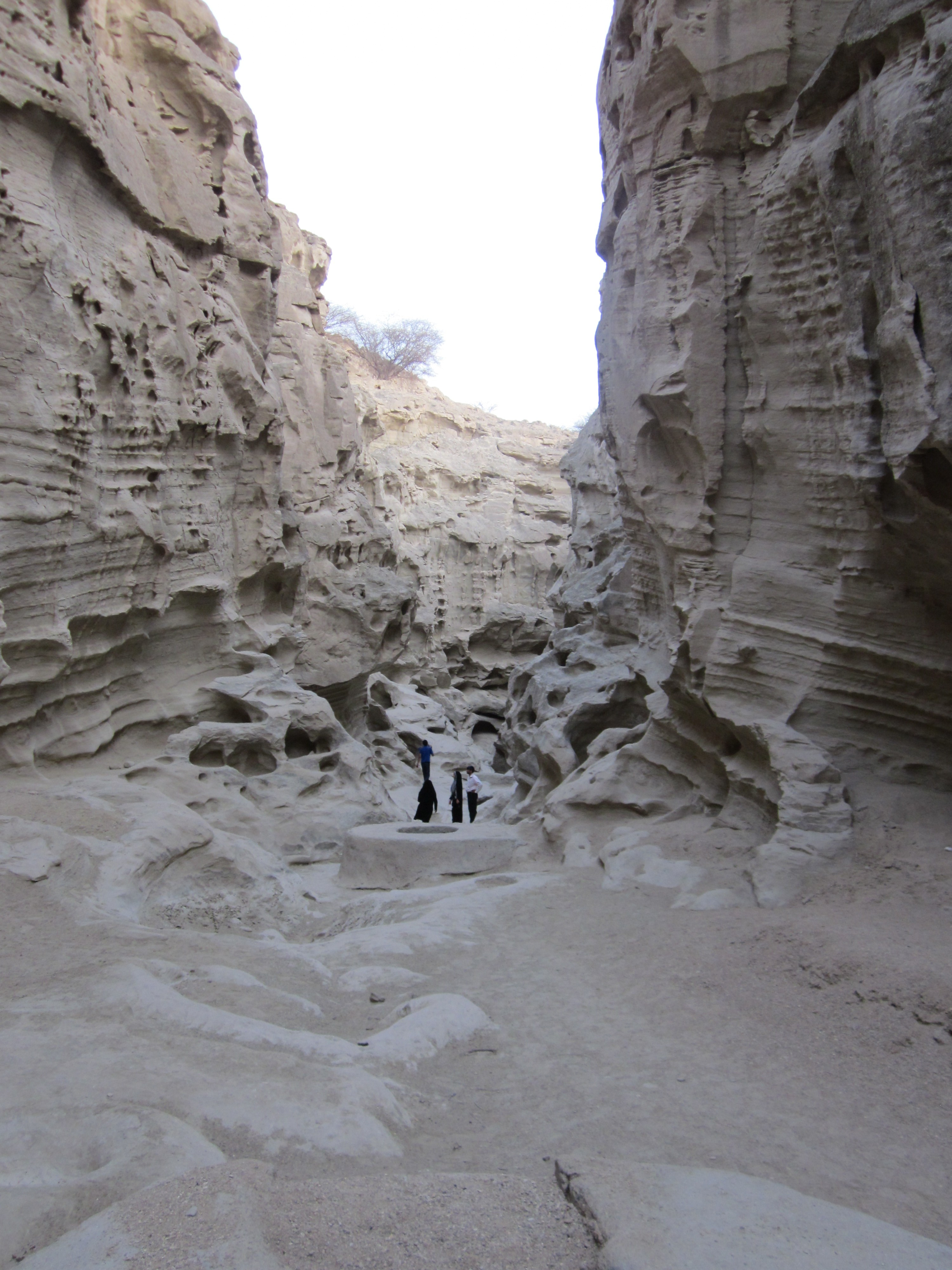
ChahKouh valley, made of Marl Sandstone

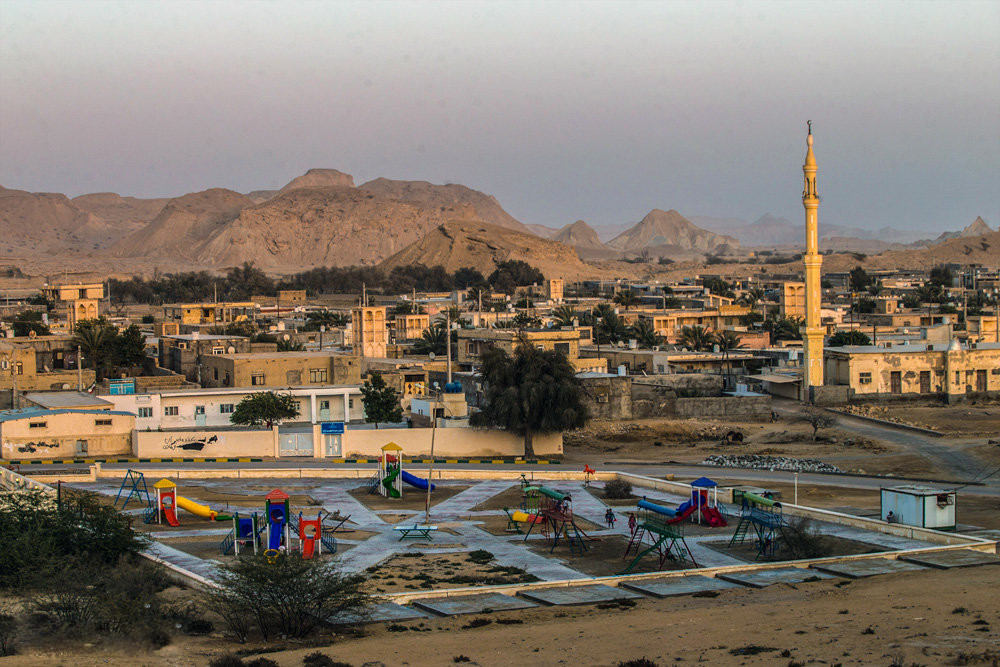
View of the historic fabric of Laft village

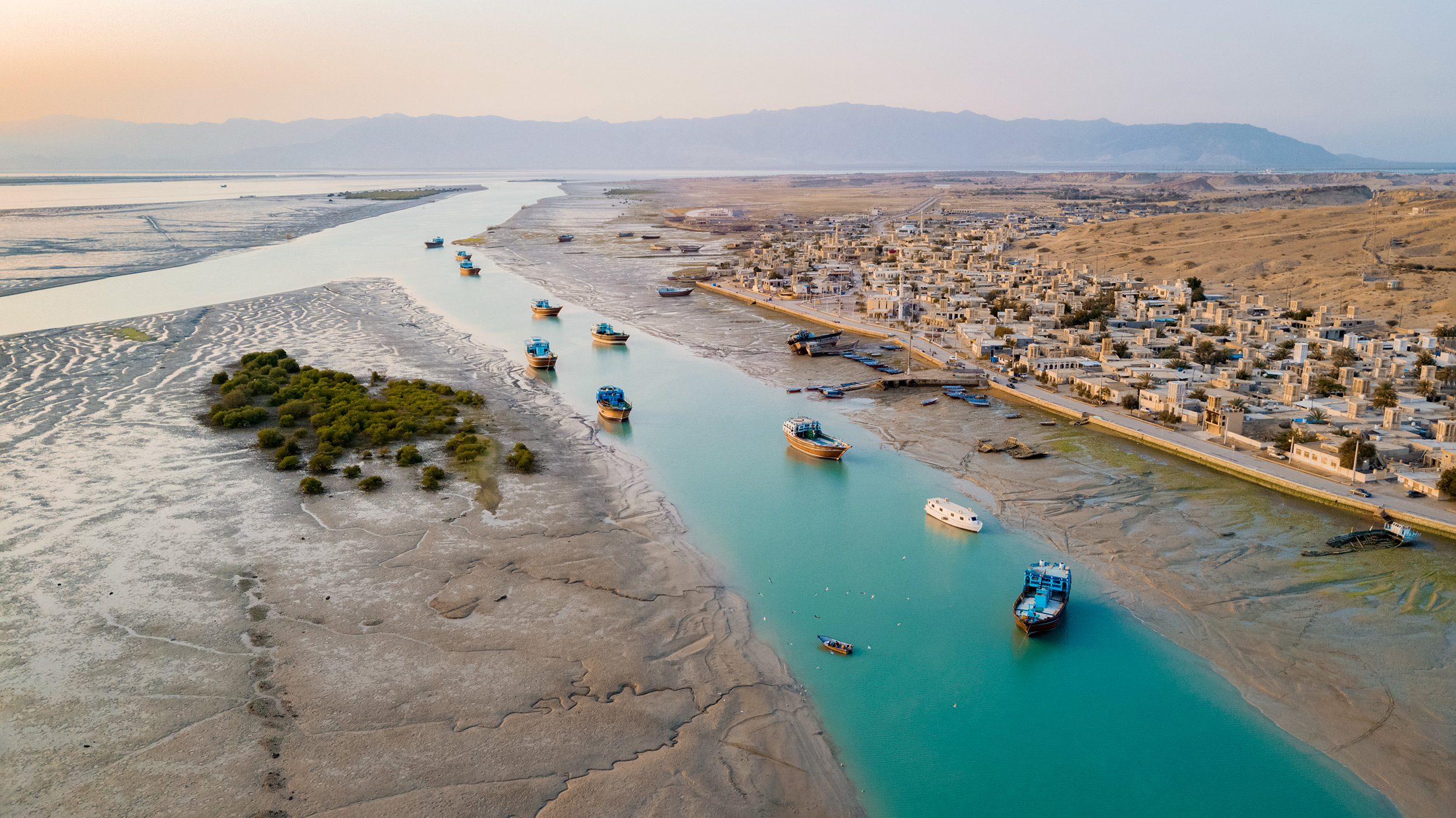
Laft village (Bandar-e Laft) on Qeshm Island

== See also ==
- 2005 Qeshm earthquake
- Bandar Lengeh
- Qeshm Air
