= Kushah, Hormozgan =

Kushah كوشه
- Village
- Location within Iran
- Coordinates: 26°51′31″N 56°00′24″E
- Country: Iran
- Province: Hormozgan
- County: Qeshm
- Bakhsh: Central
- Rural District: Ramkan

Population (2006)
  - Total: 1,492
- Time zone: UTC+3:30 (IRST)
  - Summer (DST): UTC+4:30 (IRDT)

Kushah (Persian: كوشه, also Romanized as Kūshāh and Kūshah; also known as Kooh Shah) is a village in Ramkan Rural District, in the Central District of Qeshm County, Hormozgan Province, Iran. At the 2006 census, its population was 1,492, in 281 families. The village suffered heavily in the 2005 Qeshm earthquake.
