= Jijian =

Jijian جي جيان
- Village
- Location within Iran
- Coordinates: 26°50′42″N 56°01′04″E
- Country: Iran
- Province: Hormozgan
- County: Qeshm
- Bakhsh: Central
- Rural District: Ramkan

Population (2006)
  - Total: 516
- Time zone: UTC+3:30 (IRST)
  - Summer (DST): UTC+4:30 (IRDT)

Jijian (Persian: جي جيان, also Romanized as Jījīān, Jījeyān, and Jijiyan) is a village in Ramkan Rural District, in the Central District of Qeshm County, Hormozgan Province, Iran. At the 2006 census, its population was 516, in 112 families.
