= Khaledeyn, Hormozgan =

Khaledeyn خالدين
- Village
- Location within Iran
- Coordinates: 26°52′53″N 56°00′51″E
- Country: Iran
- Province: Hormozgan
- County: Qeshm
- Bakhsh: Central
- Rural District: Ramkan

Population (2006)
  - Total: 1,019
- Time zone: UTC+3:30 (IRST)
  - Summer (DST): UTC+4:30 (IRDT)

Khaledeyn (Persian: خالدين, also Romanized as Khāledeyn and Khāledīn) is a village in Ramkan Rural District, in the Central District of Qeshm County, Hormozgan Province, Iran. At the 2006 census, its population was 1,019, in 219 families. The village suffered heavily in the 2005 Qeshm earthquake.
