= Kuvehi =

Kuvehi كووه اي
- Village
- Location within Iran
- Coordinates: 26°57′03″N 56°00′22″E
- Country: Iran
- Province: Hormozgan
- County: Qeshm
- Bakhsh: Central
- Rural District: Howmeh

Population (2006)
  - Total: 3,422
- Time zone: UTC+3:30 (IRST)
  - Summer (DST): UTC+4:30 (IRDT)

Kuvehi (Persian: كووه اي, also Romanized as Kūveh’ī; also known as Kovā’ī, Kovāy, Kowey, Kūbeh’ī, Kūveh, and Kūve’ī) is a village in Howmeh Rural District, in the Central District of Qeshm County, Hormozgan Province, Iran. At the 2006 census, its population was 3,422, in 716 families.
