= Hamiri, Hormozgan =

Hamiri حميري
- Village
- Location within Iran
- Coordinates: 26°56′55″N 56°12′05″E
- Country: Iran
- Province: Hormozgan
- County: Qeshm
- Bakhsh: Central
- Rural District: Howmeh

Population (2006)
  - Total: 27
- Time zone: UTC+3:30 (IRST)
  - Summer (DST): UTC+4:30 (IRDT)

Hamiri (Persian: حميري, also Romanized as Ḩamīrī; also known as Khamīrī) is a village in Howmeh Rural District, in the Central District of Qeshm County, Hormozgan Province, Iran. At the 2006 census, its population was 27, in 6 families.
