= Holor, Iran =

Village in Hormozgan province, Iran

Holor Persian: هلر
- Village
- Location within Iran
- Coordinates: 26°58′01″N 56°04′59″E
- Country: Iran
- Province: Hormozgan
- County: Qeshm
- District: Central
- Rural District: Ramkan

Population (2016)
  - Total: 5,828
- Time zone: UTC+3:30 (IRST)

Holor (Persian: هلر) (Note: Also romanized as Halor; also known as Dehlar and Holū) is a village in Ramkan Rural District of the Central District of Qeshm County, Hormozgan province, Iran.

== Demographics ==
=== Population ===
At the time of the 2006 National Census, the village's population was 5,043 in 1,088 households, when it was in Howmeh Rural District. The following census in 2011 counted 5,588 people in 1,260 households. The 2016 census measured the population of the village as 5,828 people in 1,531 households, by which time the village had been transferred to Ramkan Rural District. It was the most populous village in its rural district.
