= Hamari (disambiguation) =

Julia Hamari (born 21 November 1942) is a Hungarian mezzo-soprano and alto singer in opera and concert.

Hamari may also refer to:

== People ==
- Adam Hamari, American MLB umpire
- Lotta Hamari, Finnish politician
- Sanaa Hamari, Moroccan-American film and television director
- Hamari Traoré, Malian professional footballer

== Media ==
=== Film ===
- Hamari Baat (1943)
- Hamari Bahu Alka (1982)
- Hamari Beti (1590)
- Hamari Betiyan (1963)
- Hamari Paltan (2018)
- Hamari Adhuri Kahani (2015)
- Hamari Yaad Aayegi (1961)
- Neend Hamari Khwab Tumhare (1971 film)
- Neend Hamari Khwab Tumhare (1966 film)

=== Television ===
- Adhuri Kahaani Hamari (2015)
- Baat Hamari Pakki Hai (2010)
- Beti Hamari Anmol (2023)
- Byaah Hamari Bahoo Ka (2012)
- Gudiya Hamari Sabhi Pe Bhari (2019)
- Hamari Betiyoon Ka Vivaah (2008–2009)
- Hamari Devrani (2008–2012)
- Hamari Wali Good News (2020–2021)
- Tulsi – Hamari Badi Sayani (2024)
- Yeh Na Thi Hamari Qismat (2022)

== Organisations ==
- Hamari Sister Didi

== See also ==
- Harari (disambiguation)
- Hamori (disambiguation)
- Hamiri (disambiguation)
- Hasari (disambiguation)
