= Kabeli =

Kabeli may refer to:

- Kabeli, Lääne County, a village in Lääne-Nigula Parish, Lääne County, Estonia
- Kabeli, Lääne-Viru County, a village in Viru-Nigula Parish, Lääne-Viru County, Estonia
- Kabeli, Hormozgan, a village in Iran
- Kabeli River, in Nepal
