= Karavan (disambiguation) =

Karavan is a hard rock band from Pakistan.

Karavan may refer to:

- Karavan (Estonian band), band from Estonia
- Karavan (album), an album of Serbian rock band Galija
- Karavan, Batken, a village in Batken Region, Kyrgyzstan
- the former name of Kerben, Kyrgyzstan, a town in Jalal-Abad Region, Kyrgyzstan
- Karevan, a village in Hormozgan Province, Iran

== See also ==
- Karvan (disambiguation)
- Caravan (disambiguation)
