= Laft =

City in Hormozgan province, Iran

Laft Persian: لافت
- City
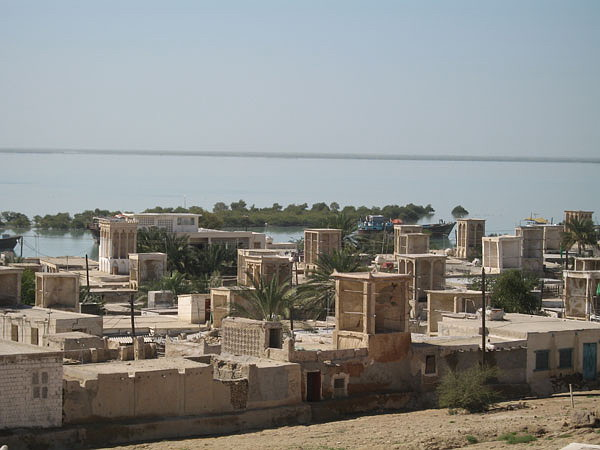
- Laft harbor

- Location within Iran
- Coordinates: 26°53′50″N 55°45′40″E
- Country: Iran
- Province: Hormozgan
- County: Qeshm
- District: Central

Population (2016)
  - Total: 4,668
- Time zone: UTC+3:30 (IRST)

Laft (Persian: لافت) (Note: Also romanized as Lāft; also known as Bandar-e Lāft, Lāft-e Now, Luft, and Yāft) is a city in the Central District of Qeshm County, Hormozgan province, Iran. Laft is more than 2,000 years old. It is on Qeshm Island in the Straits of Hormuz, to the southwest of Bandar Abbas.

== Demographics ==
=== Population ===
At the time of the 2006 National Census, Laft's population was 3,899 in 765 households, when it was a village in Howmeh Rural District. The following census in 2011 counted 4,105 people in 952 households. At the time of the 2016 National Census, the village's population was 4,668 people in 1,216 households.

In 2021, Laft was elevated to the status of a city after the census.

== Overview ==
Laft is surrounded by Hara forests (mangroves). The most obvious architectural features of the houses is their variously-sized windtowers. The people of Laft constructed them for making the inner space of the building cool in summer. The buildings of Laft are constructed close to each other, with winding and narrow alleys.

Golden wells

Historical monuments in Laft include Naderi Castle, a square-shaped castle with four towers; two rounded dome-like reservoirs; a burial ground in which some of the inscriptions are dated to 1000 years ago; and the shrines of Seyed Hassan Mansor, Sheikh Tousi, and Sheikh AndarAbi. Behind the castle, in a crater, 366 Tala (Golden) wells were dug for gathering the rainwater, one for each day of the leap year in Iran. Some historians believe that these wells date from the time of the Achaemenian and Sassanian dynasties.

At Laft harbor, there is a dock which is related to Median, Achaemenian, and Sassanian dynasties. This dock is about 130 m long and the main seabed thick of about 7 m. The walls at the dock are about 3 m that are made up bevelled stones.

Near Laft a 220 kV-powerline crosses Ghesm strait.

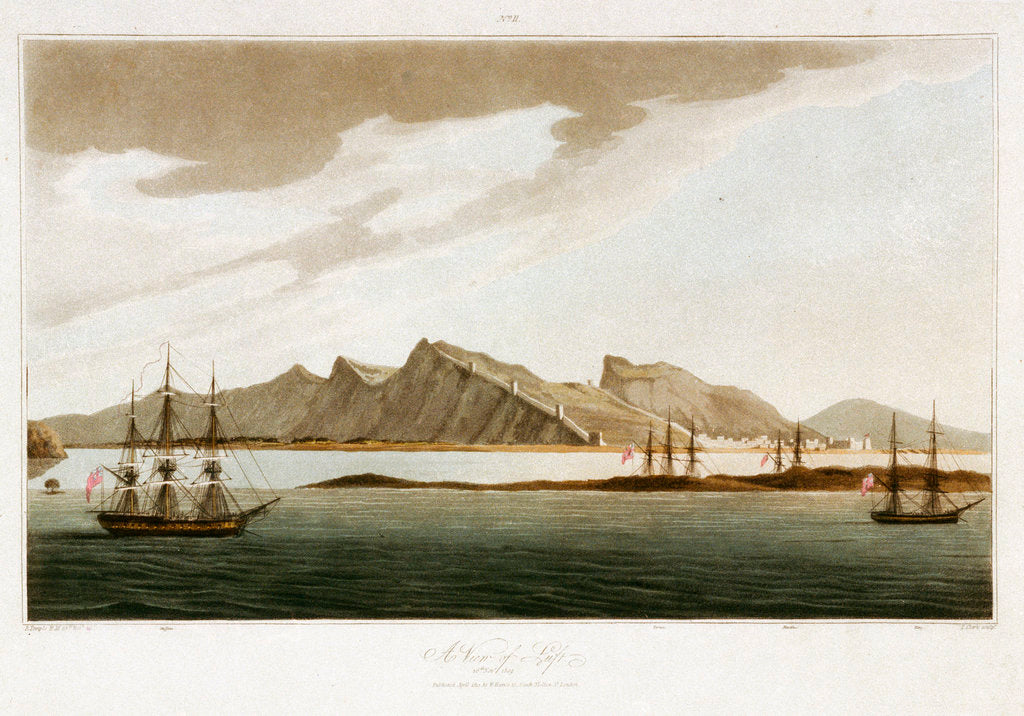
A View of Luft, on 26 November 1809, from a sketch by Richard Temple

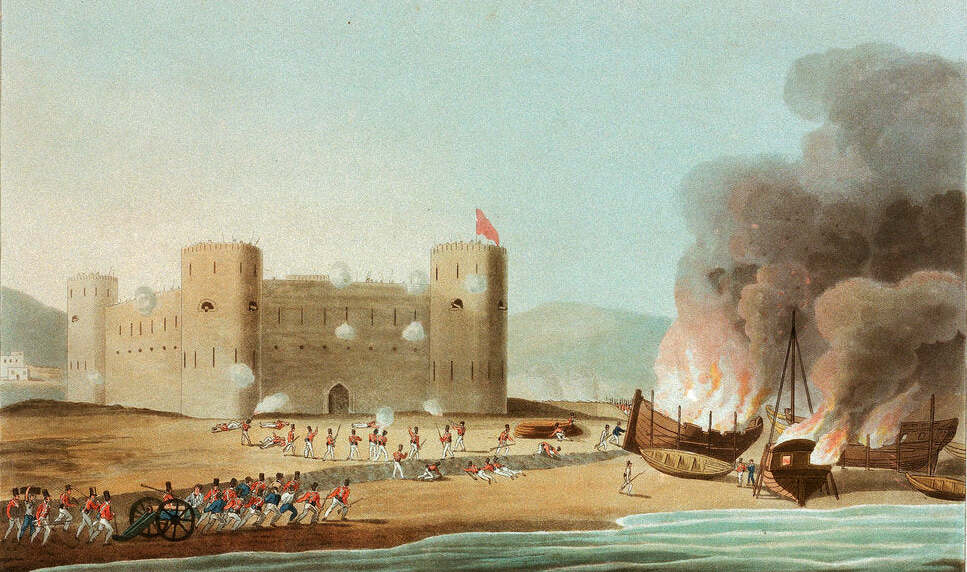
The attack by the British on the fort of Luft, 27 November 1809 during the Persian Gulf campaign of 1809

== Sheikh Andar Abi Island ==
Across from Laft and Khamir harbors, there is a very small island which is named Sheikh AndarAbi. Some parts of this small island are covered with water at high tide. The distance between Laft harbor and Sheikh AndarAbi Island can be covered by a speedboat in less than 5 minutes. At the north margin of Sheikh AndarAbi Island, the surface of the land is lower than other parts of the island and there are many Hara trees. At the southeast margin of the island there is a famous dome which is popular as the Shrine of Sheikh AndarAbi or Qadamgah-e Sheikh (footprint of the Sheikh). At high tide seawater covers the majority of the Island. Nowadays, nobody lives there, and fishermen and sailors respect this island as a biosphere reserve.
