= Tonb-e Parsan =

Village in Hormozgan province, Iran

Tonb-e Parsan Persian: تنب پارسان
- Village
- Location within Iran
- Coordinates: 26°46′12″N 55°51′57″E
- Country: Iran
- Province: Hormozgan
- County: Qeshm
- District: Central
- Rural District: Howmeh

Population (2016)
  - Total: 1,199
- Time zone: UTC+3:30 (IRST)

Tonb-e Parsan (Persian: تنب پارسان) (Note: Formeyly known as Tomban (تمبان), also romanized as Tombān; also known as Tanban and Tonbān) is a village in Howmeh Rural District of the Central District of Qeshm County, Hormozgan province, Iran. The village suffered heavily in the 2005 Qeshm earthquake.

== Demographics ==
=== Population ===
At the time of the 2006 National Census, the village's population was 941 in 244 households. The following census in 2011 counted 1,069 people in 272 households. The 2016 census measured the population of the village as 1,199 people in 329 households.
