= Tula, Iran =

Village in Hormozgan province, Iran

Tula Persian: طولا
- Village
- Location within Iran
- Coordinates: 26°58′23″N 56°13′08″E
- Country: Iran
- Province: Hormozgan
- County: Qeshm
- District: Central
- Rural District: Howmeh

Population (2016)
  - Total: 5,874
- Time zone: UTC+3:30 (IRST)

Tula (Persian: طولا) (Note: Also romanized as Ţowlā and Ţūlā; also known as Shahrak-e Ţūlā and Tāola) is a village in Howmeh Rural District of the Central District of Qeshm County, Hormozgan province, Iran.

== Demographics ==
=== Population ===
At the time of the 2006 National Census, the village's population was 1,742 in 457 households. The following census in 2011 counted 2,608 people in 714 households. The 2016 census measured the population of the village as 5,874 people in 1,588 households. It was the most populous village in its rural district.
