= Kabeli, Hormozgan =

Kabeli كابلي
- Village
- Location within Iran
- Coordinates: 26°56′30″N 56°12′25″E
- Country: Iran
- Province: Hormozgan
- County: Qeshm
- Bakhsh: Central
- Rural District: Howmeh

Population (2006)
  - Total: 31
- Time zone: UTC+3:30 (IRST)
  - Summer (DST): UTC+4:30 (IRDT)

Kabeli (Persian: كابلي, also Romanized as Kābelī) is a village in Howmeh Rural District, in the Central District of Qeshm County, Hormozgan Province, Iran. At the 2006 census, its population was 31, in 7 families.
