= Turiyan =

Village in Hormozgan province, Iran

Turiyan Persian: توريان
- Village
- Location within Iran
- Coordinates: 26°52′21″N 56°01′03″E
- Country: Iran
- Province: Hormozgan
- County: Qeshm
- District: Central
- Rural District: Ramkan

Population (2016)
  - Total: 2,339
- Time zone: UTC+3:30 (IRST)

Turiyan (Persian: توريان) (Note: Also romanized as Tourian, Tūreyān, Tūrīān, Tūrīyān, and Tūryān) is a village in, and the capital of, Ramkan Rural District of the Central District of Qeshm County, Hormozgan province, Iran. The previous capital of the rural district was the village of Ramkan, now a city. The village suffered heavily in the 2005 Qeshm earthquake.

== Demographics ==
=== Population ===
At the time of the 2006 National Census, the village's population was 2,051 in 430 households. The following census in 2011 counted 1,969 people in 453 households. The 2016 census measured the population of the village as 2,339 people in 625 households.
