= Jenő Hámori =

Jenő Hámori may refer to:

- Jenő Hámori (economist), Hungarian economist
- Jenő Hámori (fencer) (1928-2025), Hungarian Olympic fencer
