= Kuveh =

Kuveh (Persian: كووه) may refer to:

- Kuveh, Bandar Abbas
- Kuveh, Qeshm
