= Laft Castle =

Castle in Hormozgan Province, Iran

Laft castle
- قلعه لافت
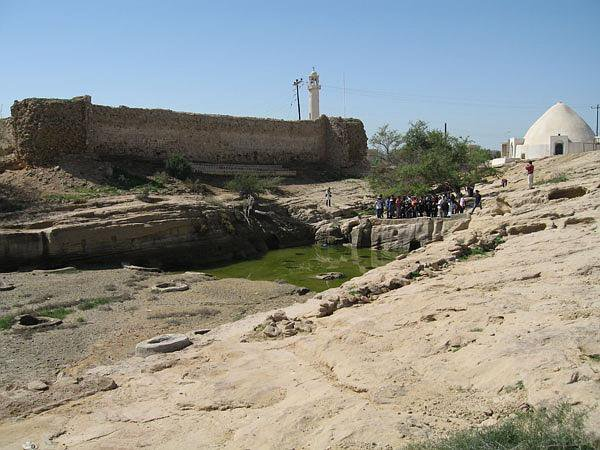
- Interactive map of the Laft castle area

General information
- Type: Castle
- Location: Qeshm County, Iran

Laft castle (Persian: قلعه لافت) is a historical castle located in Qeshm County in Hormozgan Province, The longevity of this fortress dates back to the Qajar dynasty.
