= Caravan =

Caravan or caravans may refer to:

== Transport and travel ==
- Campervan, a type of vehicle also known as a motor caravan
- Caravan (travellers), a group of travellers journeying together
- Caravan (trailer), a self-contained travel trailer camper or RV containing beds, a kitchenette, dining and storage areas; chiefly British usage
- Camel train, a convoy using camels as pack animals
- Convoy, a group of vehicles or ships traveling together for mutual support
- Caravan Tours, an escorted tour company
- Vardo (Romani wagon), or caravan, a horse-drawn wagon used by British Romanichal Travellers as their home.

=== Automobile models ===
- Caravan, (originally Car-A-Van), a term used by German automaker Opel to describe its station wagon bodystyle
- Chevrolet Caravan, a two-door station wagon sold by GM do Brasil
- Dodge Caravan, a series of minivans manufactured by Chrysler
- Nissan Caravan, a light commercial van used as a fleet vehicle or cargo vehicle
  - Nissan Caravan Elgrand, a minivan sold by Nissan Motors

=== Airplane models ===
- Cessna 208 Caravan, a turboprop, high wing, utility airplane produced by Cessna Aircraft Company
- Curtiss-Wright C-76 Caravan, an American 1940s medium military transport aircraft

== Entertainment ==
=== Film and television ===
- Caravan (1934 film), an American musical starring Charles Boyer and Loretta Young
- Caravan (1944 film), an Indian musical film directed by Aspi
- Caravan (1946 film), a British drama starring Stewart Granger
- Caravan (1971 film), an Indian film directed by Nasir Hussain
- Caravan (2025 film), a Czech film directed by Zuzana Kirchnerová-Špidlová
- Caravan, working title for the 2019 film Roads, directed by Sebastian Schipper
- Caravan (TV series), a Canadian children's television series
- Caravans (film), a 1978 film based on the James A. Michener novel
- Himalaya (film), a 1999 Nepalese film also known as Caravan
- Karwaan (lit. 'Caravan'), 2018 Indian film by Akash Khurana

=== Music ===
- Caravan (band), a progressive rock band and part of the Canterbury scene
- Caravan (Thai band), a Thai folk-rock band
- The Caravans, an American gospel music group, founded in 1947
- Caravan (Caravan album), the 1968 debut album by Caravan
- Caravan (Art Blakey album), a 1962 album by jazz musician Art Blakey
- "Caravan" (Rush song), a 2010 song by Rush
- "Caravan" (Juan Tizol and Duke Ellington song), a 1936 jazz standard
- "Caravan" (Van Morrison song), a 1970 song written by Van Morrison
- Caravan, a 2000 album by Kronos Quartet
- "Caravan", a song by Blur from their 2003 album Think Tank
- "Caravan", a song by Susumu Hirasawa from his 1995 album Sim City
- "Caravan", a song by Inspiral Carpets from their 1991 album The Beast Inside
- "Caravan", a song by Sakanaction from their 2022 album Adapt
- "Caravan", a song by Utopia from their 1980 album Adventures in Utopia
- "The Caravan", a song by Cathedral from their 1998 album Caravan Beyond Redemption
- "Caravan Song", a song by Mike Batt recorded by Barbara Dickson

=== Publishing ===
- Caravan (magazine), a UK monthly consumer magazine for the touring caravan community
- Caravan (novel), a 1942 novel by Lady Eleanor Smith
- Caravans (novel), a 1963 novel by James A. Michener
- Caravan (publishing), an Iranian publishing house
- Caravan, a 1975 novel by Stephen Goldin
- The Caravan, an Indian magazine covering politics and culture published between 1940 and 1988, and revived in 2009

=== Games ===
- Caravan, a playable card game in Fallout: New Vegas
- Caravans (Al-Qadim), an accessory for the Advanced Dungeons & Dragons role-playing game

== Other ==
- Caravan (Israel), an Israeli term referring to a portable building
- Caravan (scouting), a Scout-like organization in the United States
- Caravan or Mudhol Hound, a type of dog breed

== See also ==
- Karvan (disambiguation)
- Karavan (disambiguation)
- Camping and Caravanning Club
