= Karevan =

Karevan كاروان
- Village
- Location within Iran
- Coordinates: 26°51′46″N 56°00′10″E
- Country: Iran
- Province: Hormozgan
- County: Qeshm
- Bakhsh: Central
- Rural District: Ramkan

Population (2006)
  - Total: 598
- Time zone: UTC+3:30 (IRST)
  - Summer (DST): UTC+4:30 (IRDT)

Karevan (Persian: كاروان, also Romanized as Kārevān, Kāravān, and Kārvān) is a village in Ramkan Rural District, in the Central District of Qeshm County, Hormozgan Province, Iran. At the 2006 census, its population was 598, in 102 families. The village suffered heavily in the 2005 Qeshm earthquake.
