= Clarence Strait (disambiguation) =

Clarence Strait is a strait in southeastern Alaska.

Clarence Strait may also refer to:

- Clarence Strait (Northern Territory), Australia
- Clarence Strait (Iran)
- Clarence Streit, American journalist who played a prominent role in the Atlanticist and world federalist movements
