= Karvan =

Karvan may refer to:

== Places ==
India

- Karwan, neighbourhood in Hyderabad, Telangana, India
  - Karwan (Assembly constituency), constituency of the Telangana Legislative Assembly in India
- Kayavarohan, a village near Vadodara, Gujarat

Iran

- Karevan, a village in Hormozgan province
- Kabudan, East Azerbaijan, a village
- Karvan District (Tiran and Karvan County), in Isfahan province
- Karvan District (Zarabad County), in Sistan and Baluchestan province
- Karvan-e Olya Rural District, in Tiran and Karvan County, Isfahan province
- Karvan-e Sofla Rural District, in Tiran and Karvan County, Isfahan province

== Other uses ==
- Claudia Karvan (born 1972), Australian actress
- Karvan FK, a defunct Azerbaijani football club
- Karavaan, science festival in India
- Karwaan, 2018 Indian film by Akash Khurana
- "Ishq Jalakar (Karvaan)", a song from the 2025 Indian film Dhurandhar, remake of the qawwali song "Na To Karvan Ki Talash Hai" from Barsaat Ki Raat (1960 film)

== See also ==
- Karavan (disambiguation)
- Caravan (disambiguation)
- Karwan-E-Hayat, 1935 Indian film
- Karwan-i-Islami, Islamic religious organization in India
- Karwan-e-Mohabbat, civilian campaign for tolerance in India
- Karwan-e-Zindagi, autobiography of Abul Hasan Ali Hasani Nadwi
