= Holu =

Holu may refer to:

- Holu language
- Holu, Iran, a village in Hormozgan Province, Iran
