= Dargahan =

City in Hormozgan province, Iran

Dargahan Persian: درگهان
- City
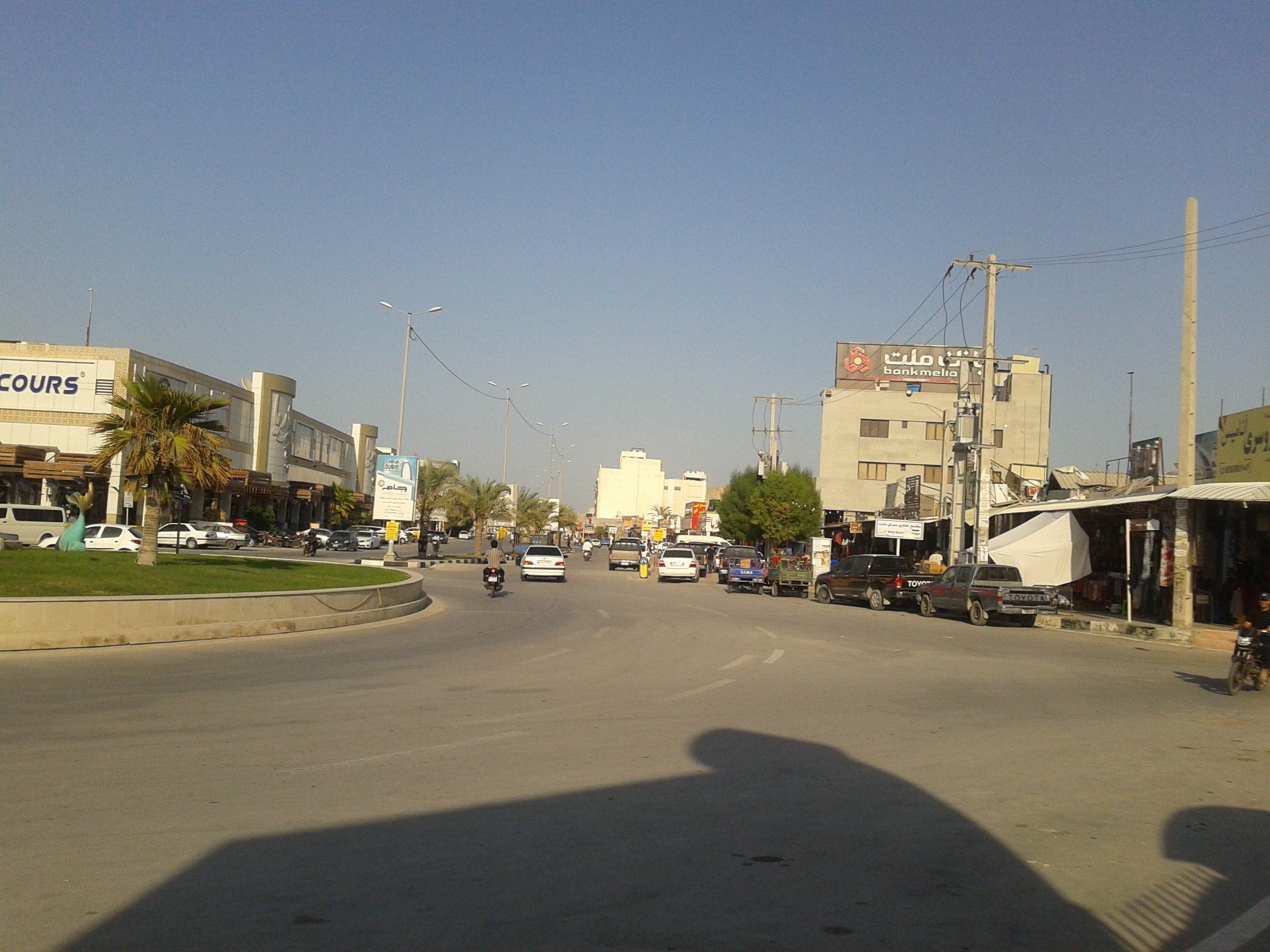
- Street in the city of Dargahan

- Location within Iran
- Coordinates: 26°58′00″N 56°04′15″E
- Country: Iran
- Province: Hormozgan
- County: Qeshm
- District: Central

Population (2016)
  - Total: 14,525
- Time zone: UTC+3:30 (IRST)
- Area code: 0782-362

Dargahan (Persian: درگهان) (Note: Also romanized as Dargahān; also known as Bandar-e Dargahān and Dargawān) is a coastal city in the Central District of Qeshm County, Hormozgan province, Iran, serving as the administrative center for Howmeh Rural District.

== Demographics ==
=== Population ===
At the time of the 2006 National Census, the city's population was 7,996 in 1,738 households. The following census in 2011 counted 8,667 people in 2,198 households. The 2016 census measured the population of the city as 14,525 people in 3,845 households.
