= Hamori =

Hamori or Hámori may refer to:

== People ==
- András Hámori, Hungarian film producer
- Ferenc Hámori (born 1972), former Hungarian footballer
- István Hámori (born 1967), Hungarian footballer
- Jenő Hámori (economist), Hungarian economist
- Jenő Hámori (fencer) (1933–2025), Hungarian fencer
- József Hámori (1932–2021), Hungarian biologist and politician
- Luca Hámori (born 2001), Hungarian amateur boxer

== Fictional characters ==
- Hamori Sakura, from the 2025 anime series You and Idol Pretty Cure

== Places ==
- Lake Hámori, lake in Hungary
- Hamori, South Korea, a town on the south coast of Jeju island
- Hamori (crater), a large crater in the southern hemisphere of the dwarf planet Ceres
