= Clarence Strait (Iran) =

Narrow strait separating the Iranian island of Qeshm from the Iranian mainland

Coordinates: 26°54′N 55°46′E

Designations

Ramsar Wetland
- Official name: Khuran Straits
- Designated: 23 June 1975
- Reference no.: 50

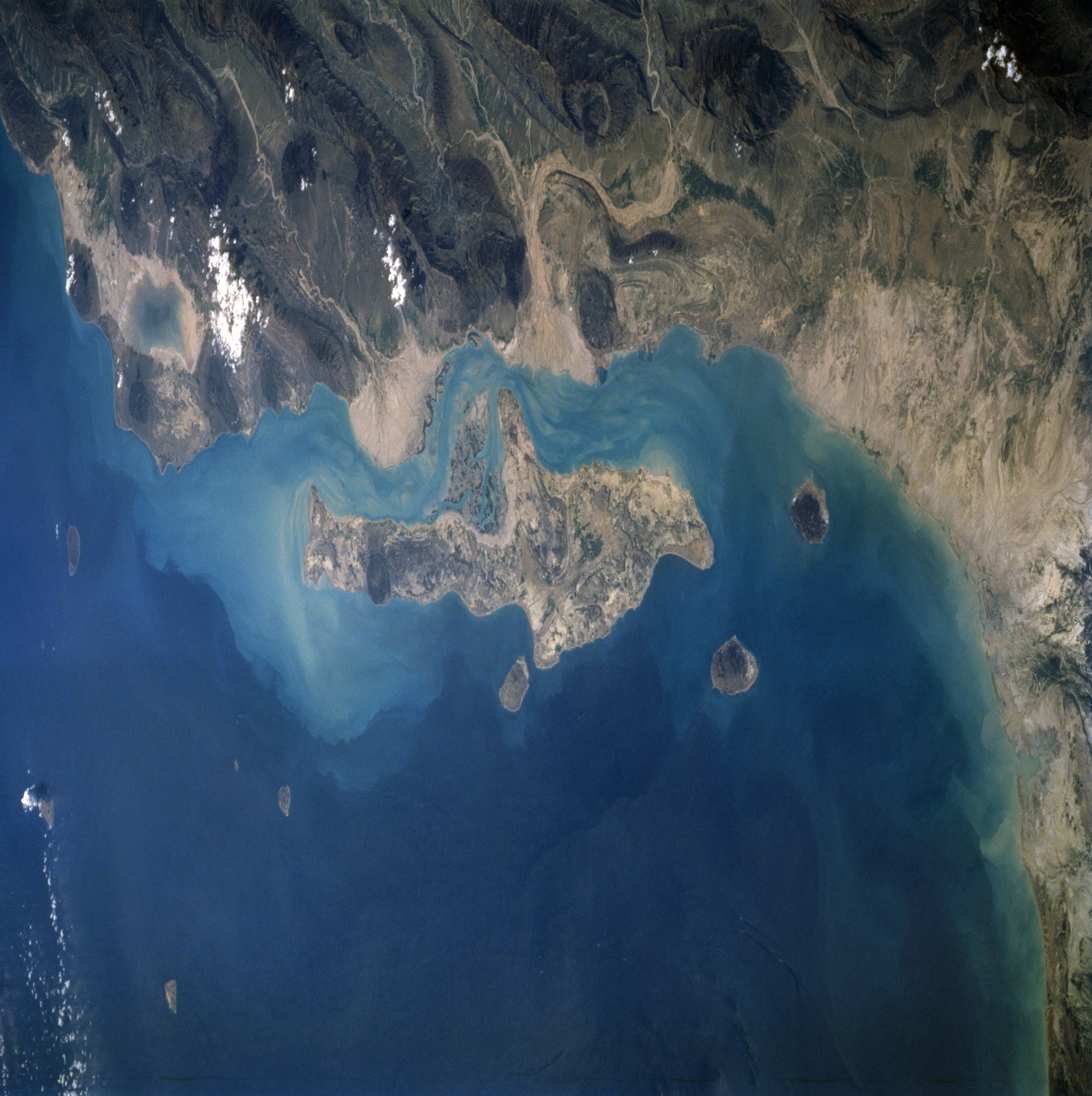
Qeshm and the strait separating it from the mainland

The Clarence Strait is a narrow strait separating the Iranian island of Qeshm from the Iranian mainland. It is the much smaller counterpart to the Strait of Hormuz. The native name for the strait is Khuran.

The Clarence Strait is host to the most extensive mangrove forest in the Persian Gulf, known locally as the Hara forests. The area has been designated as a protected Ramsar site since 1975.

== Natural features ==
The ocean waters in the Clarence Strait area, which separates Qeshm Island from Iran, offer a diverse range of colors, like the land surfaces. While the waters south of the island appear uniformly dark, curved bands of lighter colors cross the Clarence Strait, likely due to shallower water and suspended sediment.
