= Kabeli B1 Hydropower Station =

Kabeli B - 1 Hydropower Station
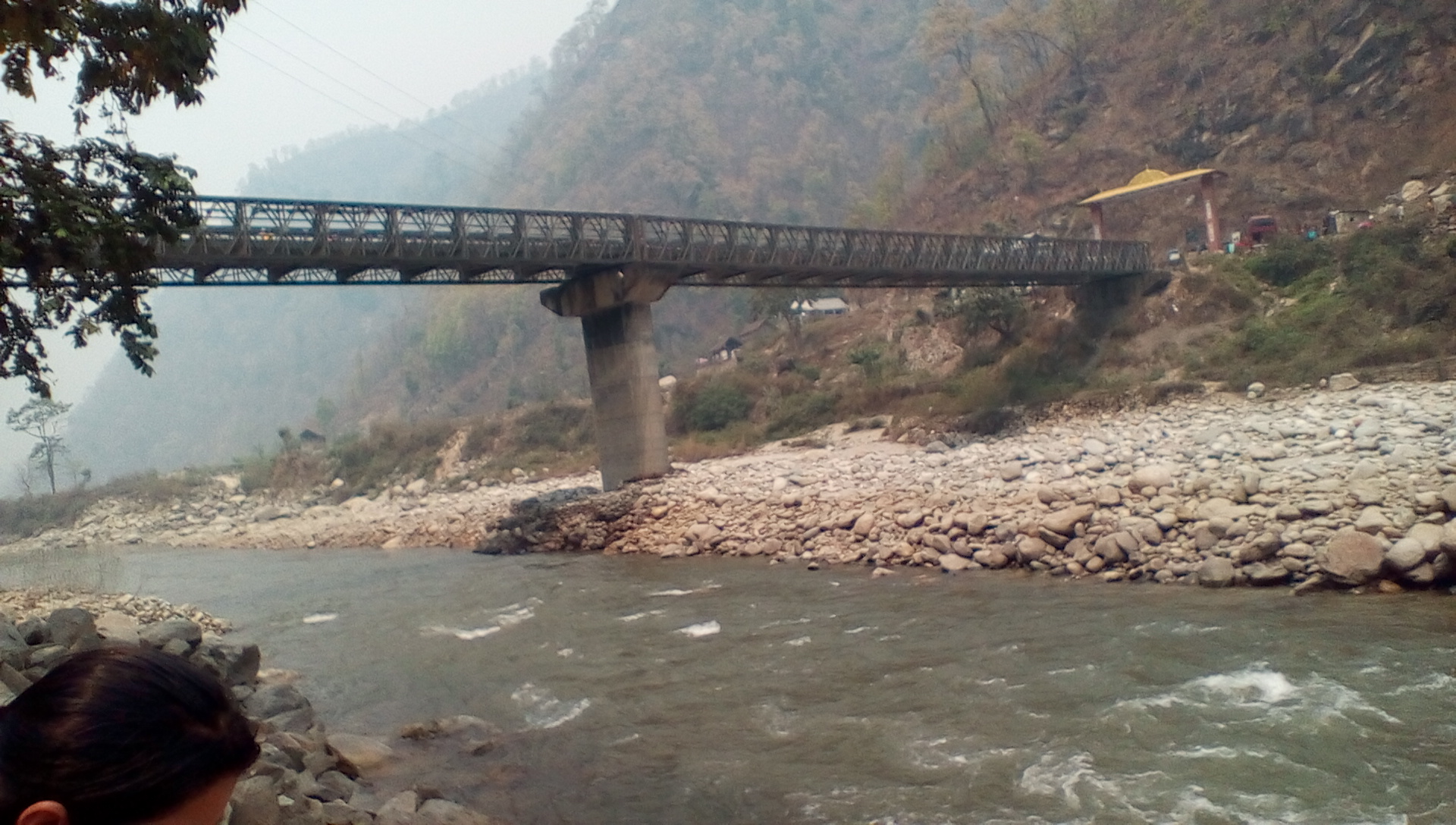

- Location within Nepal
- Official name: Kabeli B - 1 Hydropower Project
- Country: Nepal
- Location: Panchthar District
- Coordinates: 27°16′23″N 87°50′10″E
- Purpose: Power
- Status: Operational
- Owner: Arun Kabeli Power Limited.

Dam and spillways
- Type of dam: Gravity
- Impounds: Kabeli River

Power Station
- Commission date: 2076-07-23 BS
- Type: Run-of-the-river
- Installed capacity: 25 MW

Kabeli B1 Hydropower Station (Nepali: काबेली B-१ जलविद्युत आयोजना) is a 25 MW run-of-river hydro-electric plant located in Panchthar District of Nepal. The promoter and operator, with a 20% share, is Arun Kabeli Power Limited (AKPL), a subsidiary of Arun Valley Group.

== Location and water supply ==
Kabeli B1 Hydropower Station is a run-of-the-river hydroelectricity station located in the Panchthar and Taplejung districts of Mechi Zone in the Eastern Development Region of Nepal. It is about 8 kilometres (5.0 mi) from the city of Ganesh Chowk. It is along the Kabeli River near where it is joined by the Iwa River. The flow is used to generate 25 MW of electricity.

== Construction ==
The Kabeli B-1 project was launched in December 2010. Palanchowk Construction Company undertook civil works and Api Hydromechanical Company undertook hydro-mechanical work. Palanchowk and Api are both affiliated with the Arun Valley Group, the project promoter. Andritz Hydro Pvt of India and the associated Neon Energy Pvt of India won the electromechanical contract. The Ministry of Energy approved an initial environmental examination report on 27 August 2012 and granted a power generation license on 12 July 2013. As of mid-March 2016 construction was 25% complete.

As of 2017 the project was one of 37 being built in the Eastern Region of Nepal. In November 2017 Arun Kabeli Power Limited reported that 95% of construction was completed, and test production could begin in mid-February 2018. The civil works, hydro mechanical works and electromechanical works were mostly completed, including the dam, sedimentation reservoir, penstock pipeline, surge tank and powerhouse. Six of the sixteen transmission line towers had been installed. Structures still under construction included intake and tailrace gates and several intermediate gates, as well as installation of two turbines, governors, generators and transformers.

Test electricity generation began in September 2019, with plans to start normal power production within a month if the Nepal Electricity Authority gave permission to connect to the central transmission line. The plant started delivering electricity from 23 Ashwin 2076 BS, or 10 October 2019 CE. According to the Arun Kabeli Power Company, power delivery had been delayed by one year due to delays in the completion of the third section of the transmission line.

== Technical description ==
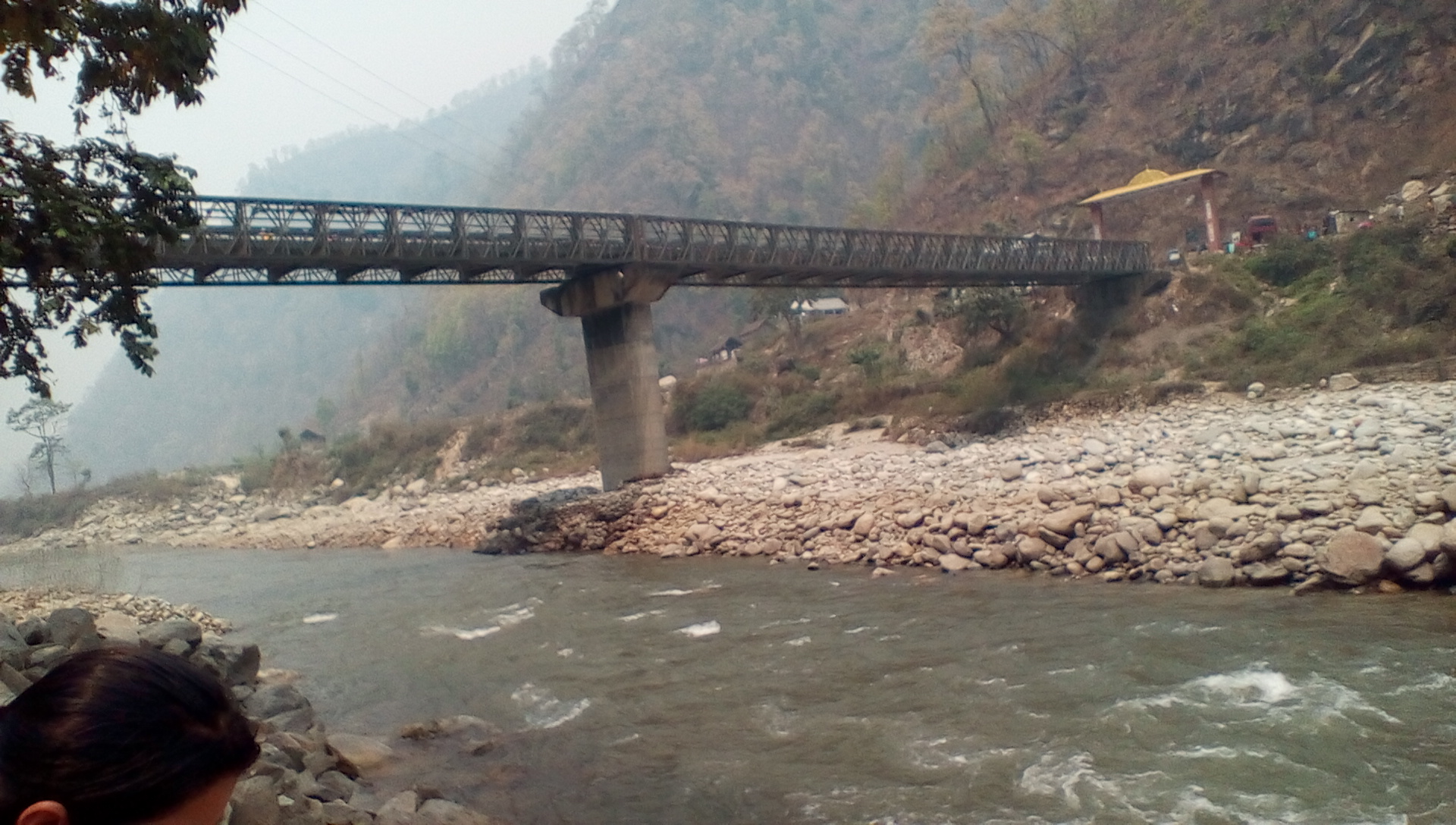
Kabeli River

The intake is in the Tharpu and Thumbedin VDCs. It has a gross head of 93.7 metres (307 ft). It consists of a barrage-type gated weir 36 metres (118 ft) long and 4 metres (13 ft) high with four 6 by 4 metres (20 by 13 ft) gates and two 6 by 5 metres (20 by 16 ft) sluices. Water is led from the weir to a 140 by 14 metres (459 by 46 ft) settling basin, from 7.18 to 10 metres (23.6 to 32.8 ft) deep, divided into two rectangular bays.

From the de-sanding basin a 4.5 kilometres (2.8 mi) headrace pipe with diameter 4 metres (13 ft) carries the water to the power station. At its lower end the conduit feeds into a vertical cylindrical concrete surge tank. A 286 metres (938 ft) steel penstock pipe from 3.75 to 2.65 metres (12.3 to 8.7 ft) in diameter leads from the headrace pipe where it joins the surge tank shaft to the turbines in the power station.

Power is generated by two horizontal 12.5 MW Francis turbines. These feed two generators with rated voltage of 6.3 kV. The energy is carried to the national grid by the Mechi Corridor 132 kV transmission line from Damak to Amarpur in Panchthar district. The transmission line has 16 towers. It is about 4 kilometres (2.5 mi) long. Planned annual power production was about 151.65 GWh.

== Ownership and finance ==
The estimated cost as of November 2017 was Rs4.3 billion. As of November 2017 70% of the project was owned by the state-owned Hydroelectricity Investment and Development Company with a consortium of banks including Nepal Investment Bank, Nabil Bank, Machhapuchchhre Bank, Prabhu Bank, Laxmi Bank and Global IME Bank. 20% was owned by the promoter Arun Kabeli Power Limited (AKPL), an Independent Power Producer. The remaining 10% was reserved for the people of Panchthar and Taplejung. Arun Kabeli Power Limited (AKPL) was incorporated on 17 January 2011 and is part of Arun Valley Hydropower Group.

AKPL signed agreements with the Nepal Electricity Authority to connect the station to the grid and to purchase the power in 2012. The power purchase rate is Rs.4.80 per kW in the wet months (May to December) and Rs.8.40 per kW in the dry months (January to April). The generation licence will expire after 30 years in 27 Jesṭha 2105 BS, after which the plant will be handed over to the government.

== See also ==
- List of power stations in Nepal

== Sources ==
- "25 MW power of Kabeli B-1 has been connected to the national grid (काबेली बी–१ को २५ मेगावाट विद्युत राष्ट्रिय प्रणालीमा जोडियो)", UrjaKhabar (in Nepali), 2019-10-13, archived from the original on 2020-02-15
- Bijay Bodh Lawati (2017), "560 MW electricity being generated in Eastern Region (पूर्वाञ्चलमा ५६० मेगावाट विद्युत उत्पादन हुँदै)", eHimalayatimes (in Nepali), archived from the original on 2021-09-25
- "Construction of Kabeli B1 Hydropower Project 95% Completed", Nepal Energy Forum, 4 December 2017
- ICRA Nepal assigns [ICRANP] IPO Grade 4+ to the proposed initial public offering (IPO) of Arun Kabeli Power Company Limited (PDF), ICRA Nepal
- "Kabeli B1 starts test power production", The Himalayan Times, 18 September 2019
- Keshav Prasad Bhattarai (2019), "ताप्लेजुङमा ५ सय मेगावाट विद्युत उत्पादनका लागि काम सुरु, ३५ मेगावाट तत्काल राष्ट्रिय प्रशारणमा जोडिने (Work started to generate 500 MW of electricity in Taplejung, 35 MW will be connected to national transmission immediately)", Ujyaalo Online (in Nepali)
- Nepal, Kabeli B1, Andritz Group
- Power Plants :: Hydro (More than 1MW), 27 November 2020
- Shahi Man Rai (19 November 2017), "Kabeli B1 hydro project to be completed in mid-Feb", Kathmandu Post
- Welcome to Arun Kabeli Power, AKPL.
