= Ramkan =

City in Hormozgan province, Iran

Ramkan Persian: رمكان
- City
- Location within Iran
- Coordinates: 26°52′07″N 56°02′20″E
- Country: Iran
- Province: Hormozgan
- County: Qeshm
- District: Central

Population (2016)
  - Total: 4,473
- Time zone: UTC+3:30 (IRST)

Ramkan (Persian: رمكان) (Note: Also romanized as Ramakān and Ramkān) is a city in the Central District of Qeshm County, Hormozgan province, Iran. It served as the capital of Ramkan Rural District until its capital was transferred to the village of Turiyan. Ramkan suffered heavily in the 2005 Qeshm earthquake.

== Demographics ==
=== Population ===
At the time of the 2006 National Census, Ramkan's population was 3,385 in 672 households, when it was a village in Ramkan Rural District. The following census in 2011 counted 3,607 people in 823 households. The 2016 census measured the population of the village as 4,473 people in 1,135 households.

After the census, Ramkan was elevated to the status of a city.
