= Hamiri =

Hamiri or Homiri (Persian: حميري) may refer to:

- Hamiri, Hormozgan
- Hamiri, Sistan and Baluchestan
