= Shib Deraz =

Shib Deraz شيبدراز
- Village
- Location within Iran
- Coordinates: 26°41′21″N 55°55′48″E
- Country: Iran
- Province: Hormozgan
- County: Qeshm
- Bakhsh: Shahab
- Rural District: Suza

Population (2006)
  - Total: 461
- Time zone: UTC+3:30 (IRST)
  - Summer (DST): UTC+4:30 (IRDT)

Shib Deraz (Persian: شيبدراز, also romanized as Shīb Derāz) is a village in Suza Rural District, Shahab District, Qeshm County, Hormozgan Province, Iran. At the 2006 census, its population was 461 people in 93 families.

== Turtle breeding ==
The village is famous for its efforts to support the breeding of Hawksbill sea turtles.
