= Kabeli River =

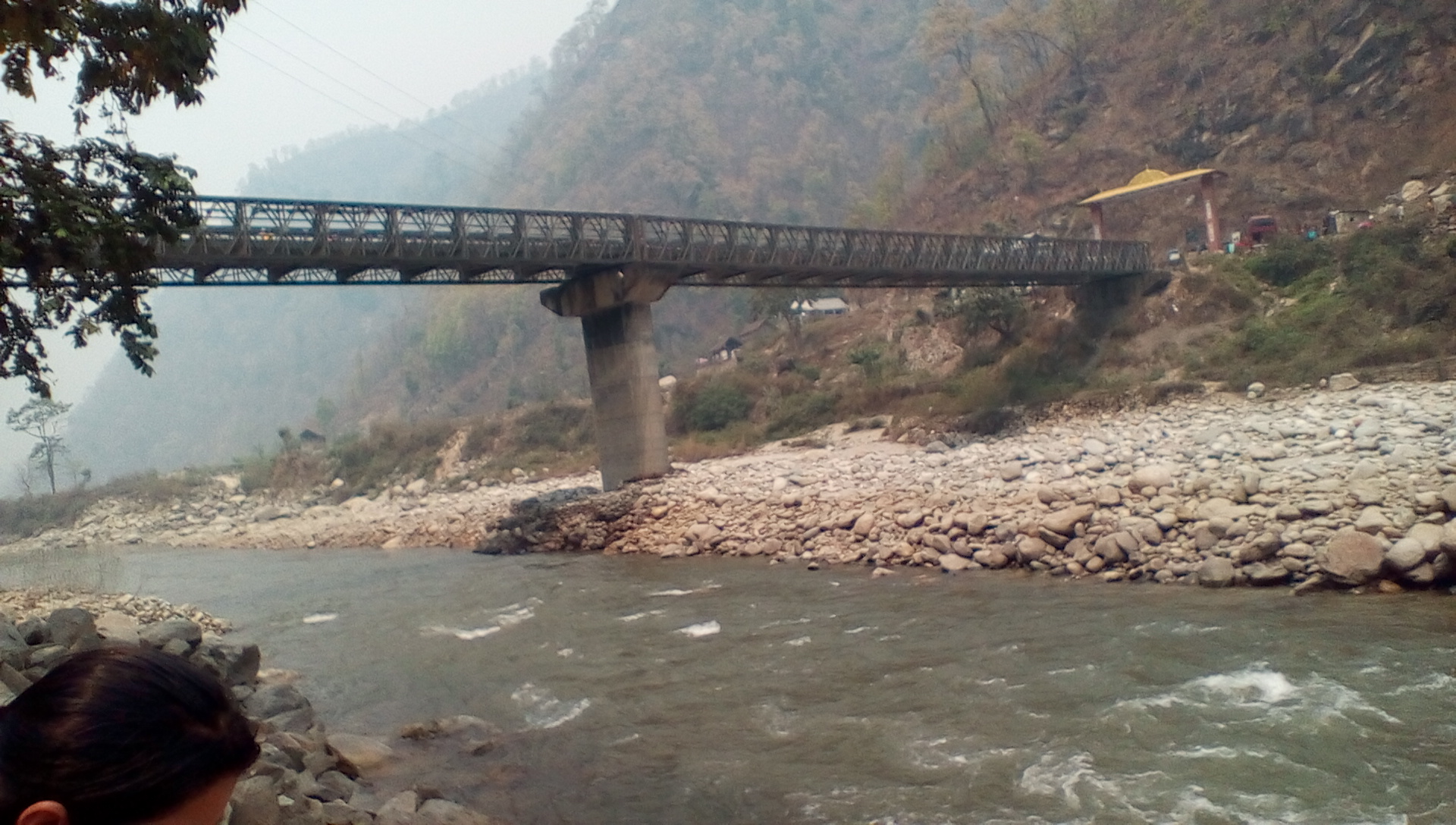

Location
- Country: Nepal

Physical characteristics
- Mouth: Tamur River
  - coordinates: 27°17′29″N 87°41′46″E
- Length: 58 km
- Basin size: about 900 km²

Kabeli River is a river in Taplejung District, Nepal. The river is 58 km long and basin size is about 900 km^{2}.

The 25 MW Kabeli B1 Hydropower Station draws water from the river.
