= Karavan (Estonian band) =

Estonian musical group

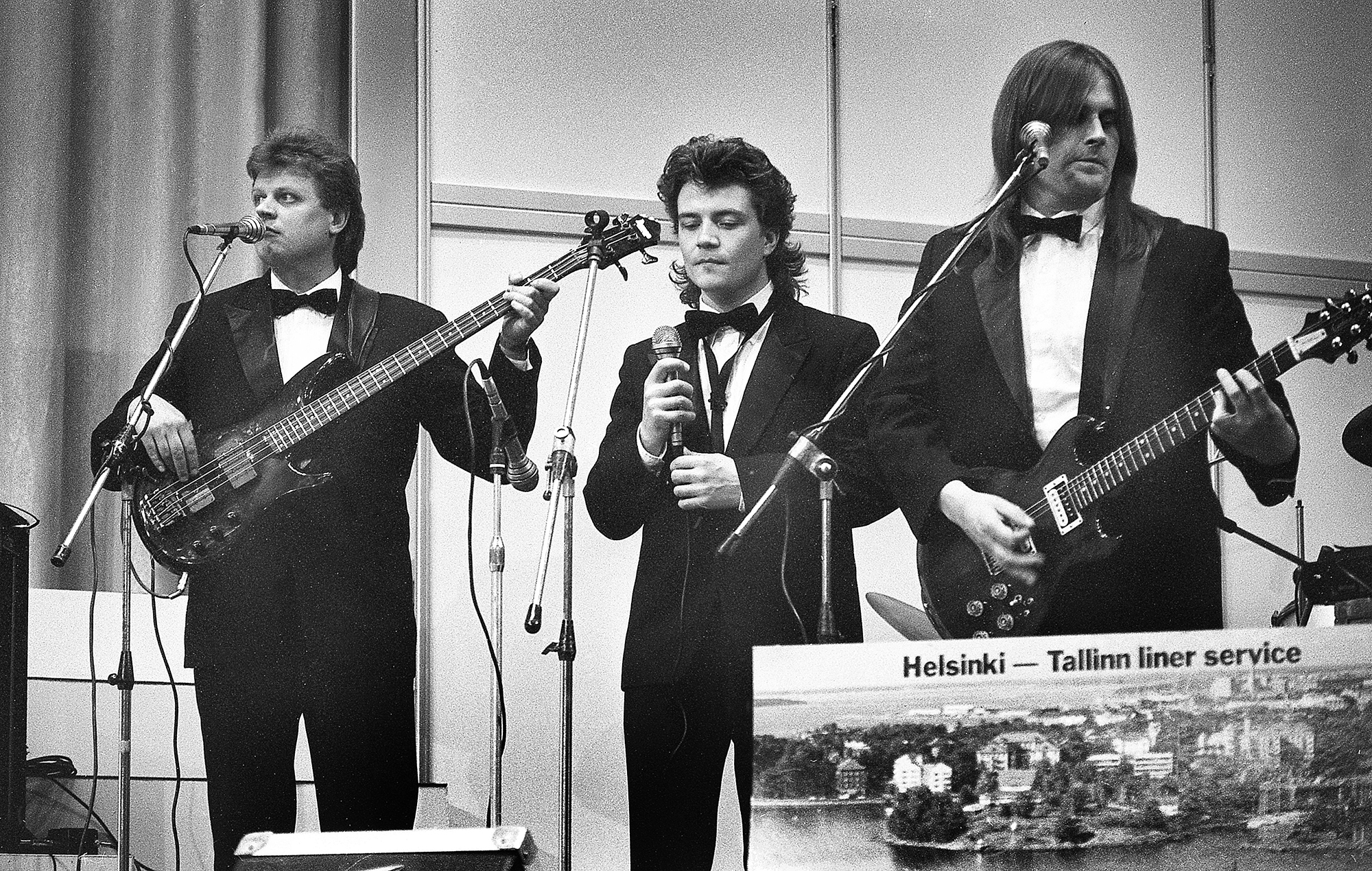
Karavan in 1989

Karavan is an Estonian vocal-instrumental band, which was established in 1983.

In 1984, 1985 and 1986, the band was named as "the best band of the year".

The band was accompanied the participant Silvi Vrait in Eurovision Song Contest 1994.

== Members ==
Members since 1997:

- Agu Tammeorg
- Margus Martmaa
- Aarne Saluveer
- Meelis Pundar.

== Discography ==
=== Albums ===
- "Kauneid jõule"
- "Raimond Valgre laule"
- "Kutse tantsule. 13 popurriid"
