= Qeshm, Hormozgan =

City in Hormozgan province, Iran

Qeshm Persian: قشم
- City
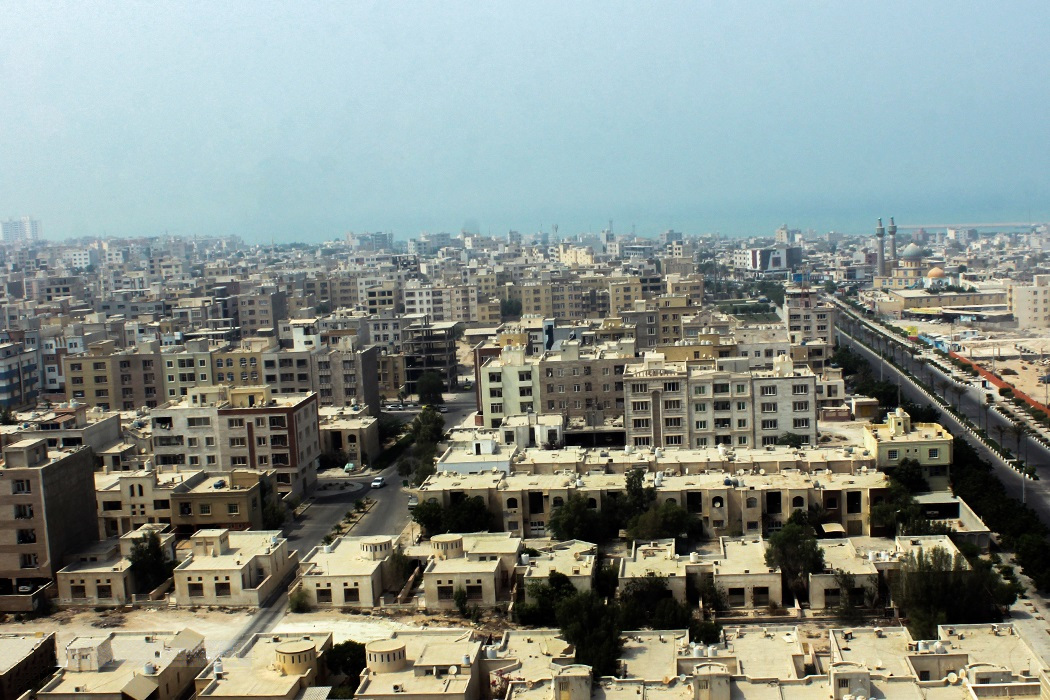
- The city of Qeshm

- Location within Iran
- Coordinates: 26°56′58″N 56°16′05″E
- Country: Iran
- Province: Hormozgan
- County: Qeshm
- District: Central

Population (2016)
  - Total: 40,678
- Time zone: UTC+3:30 (IRST)

Qeshm (Persian: قشم) (Note: Also known as Bandar-e Qeshm and Qishm) is a coastal city in the Central District of Qeshm County, Hormozgan province, Iran, serving as capital of both the county and the district.

== Demographics ==
=== Population ===
In the 2006 census, the city's population was 24,461, in 5,882 households. The 2011 census counted 28,602 people, in 7,524 households. The 2016 census counted 40,678 people, in 11,945 households.

== Gallery ==
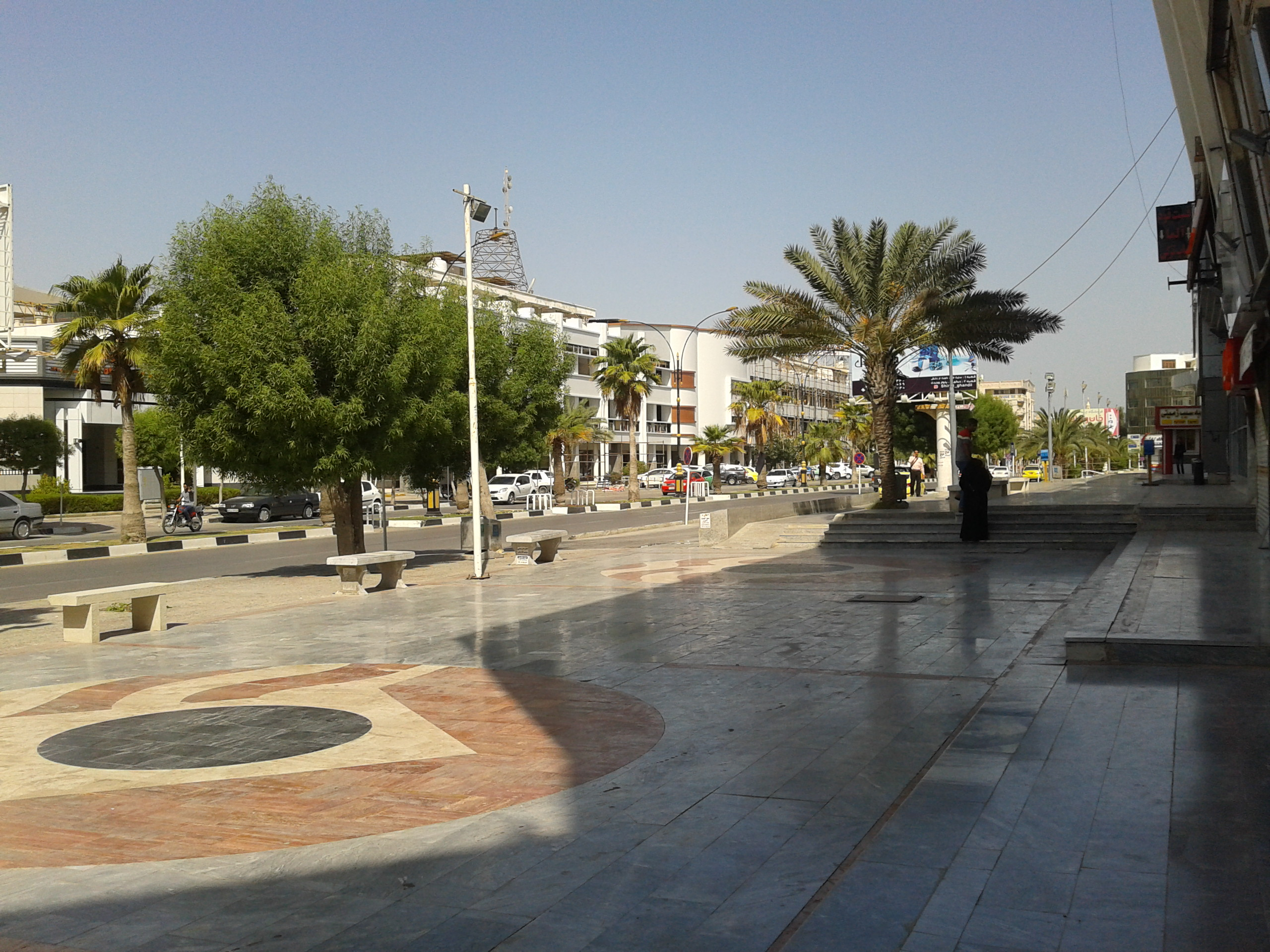
A street in Qeshm

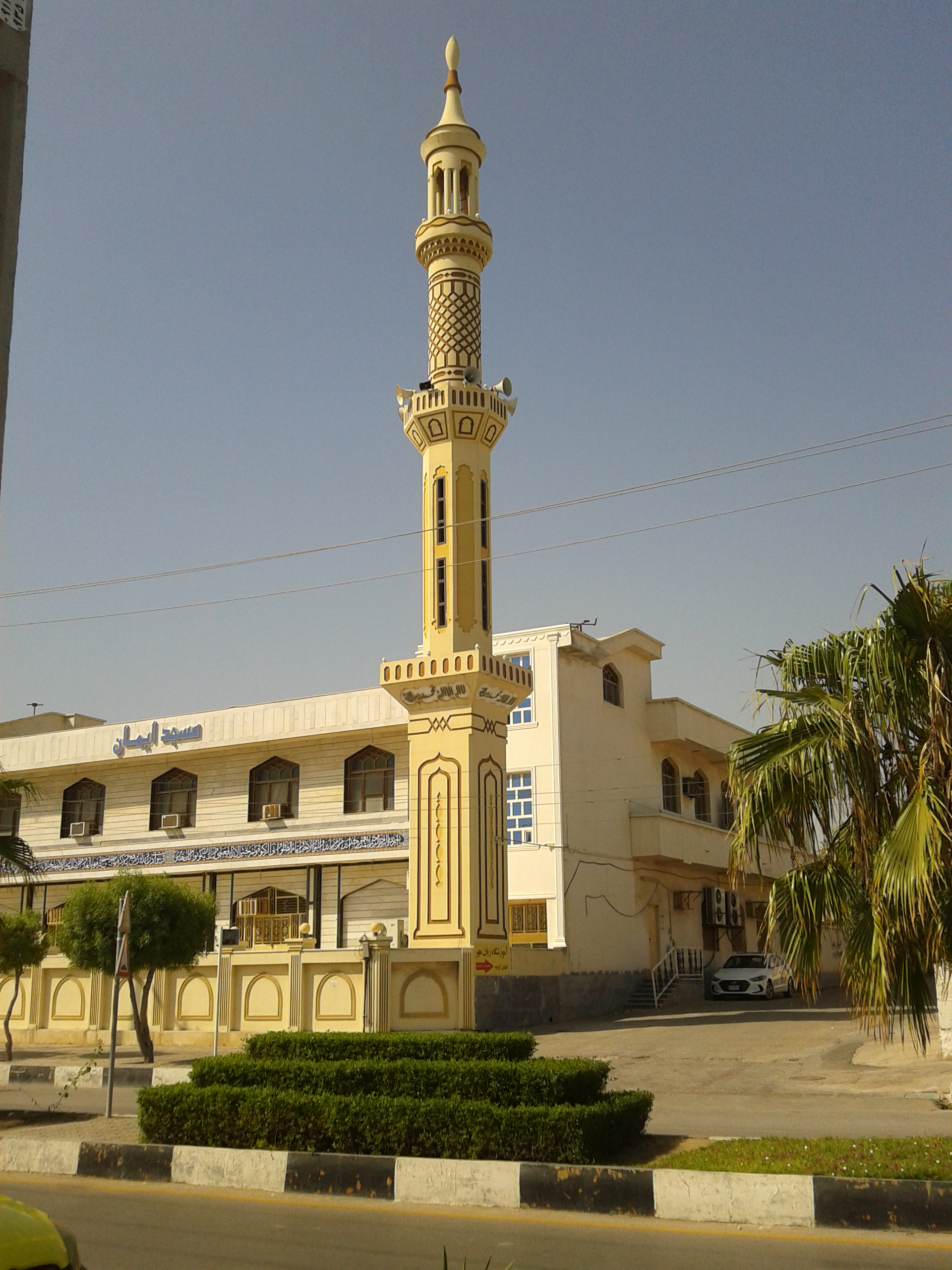
A Mosque in Qeshm

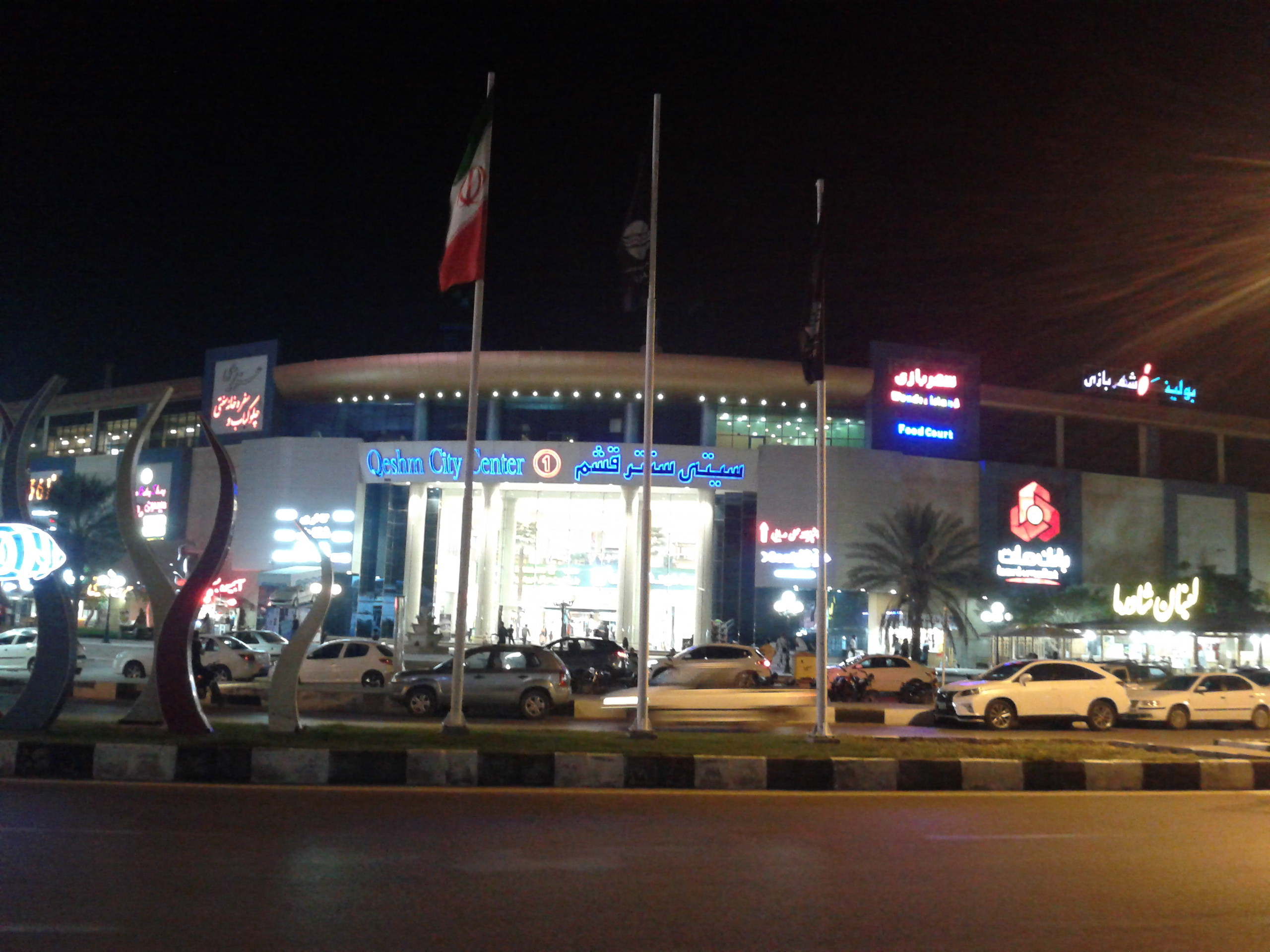

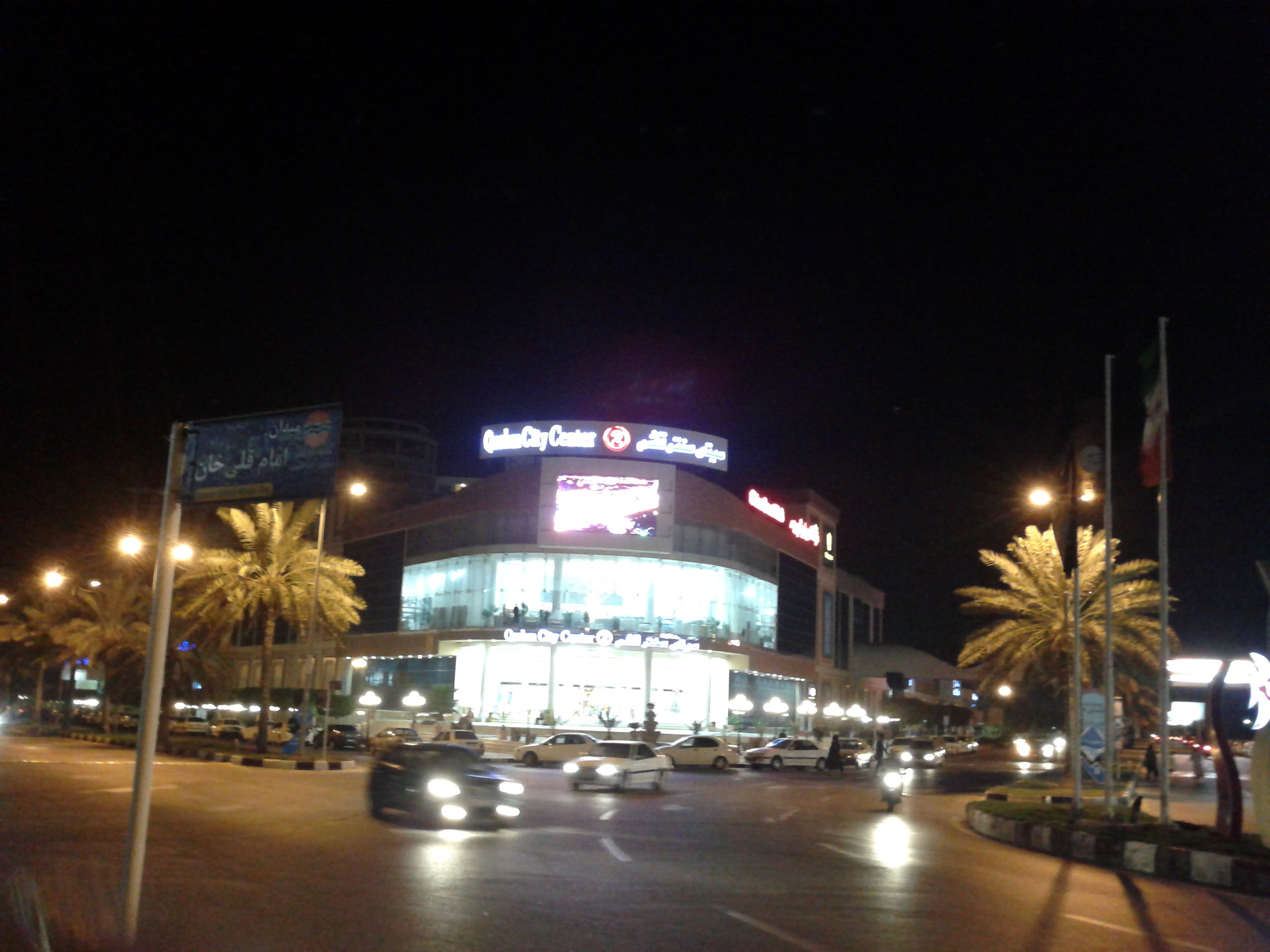

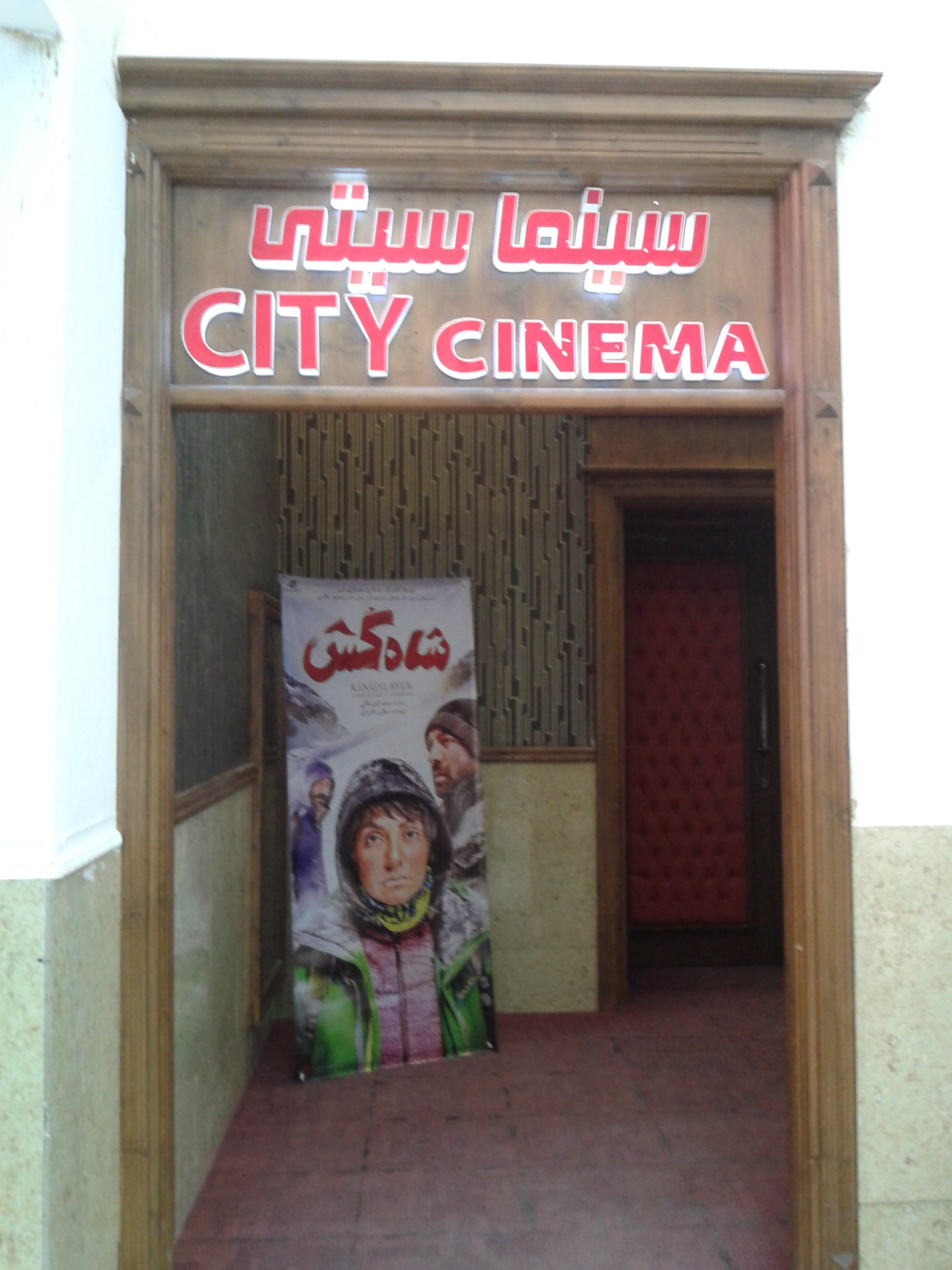
Qeshm Cinema
