= Caravan (TV series) =

Canadian children's television series

- Genre: Children's television
- Country of origin: Canada
- Original languages: English; French
- No. of seasons: 3

Production
- Producers: Fernand Dore (1960); Maurice Dubois; Pierre Desjardins; Guy Leduc
- Running time: 60 minutes

Original release
- Network: CBC Television; Radio-Canada
- Release: 1 July 1960 – 28 September 1962

Caravan is a Canadian children's television series that aired on CBC Television from 1960 to 1962.

== Premise ==
This bilingual series featured a set that resembled a two-ring circus and recorded before an audience of approximately 700. Ringmaster Monsieur Loyal (Guy Mauffette) presented various circus acts such as animals, lion tamers and trapeze performers. Two clowns (Guy L'Ecuyer, Giani Scarpi) were also series regulars.

== Production ==
The Montreal-produced Caravan occasionally recorded episodes in other communities in Ontario, Quebec and in 1962 the Atlantic.

== Scheduling ==
This hour-long series was broadcast on Fridays on CBC's English network at 4:30 p.m. (Eastern) for three seasons, each from early July to September. On Radio-Canada, the French network, episodes were seen on Saturdays.
