= Mangrove forests of Qeshm =

Mangrove forests in southern Iran

Coordinates: 26°50′N 55°41′E

UNESCO Biosphere Reserves in Iran

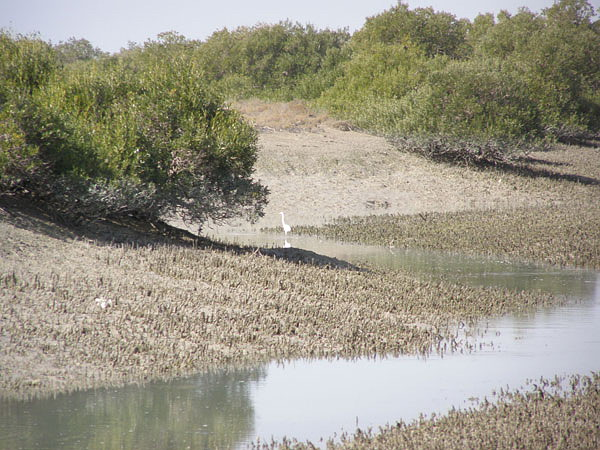
Hara Forests

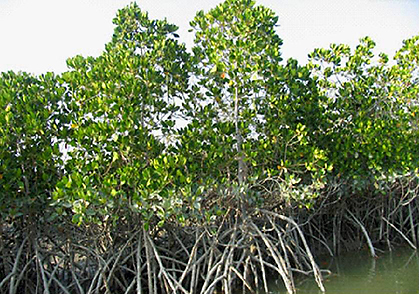
Hara Forests in Qeshm

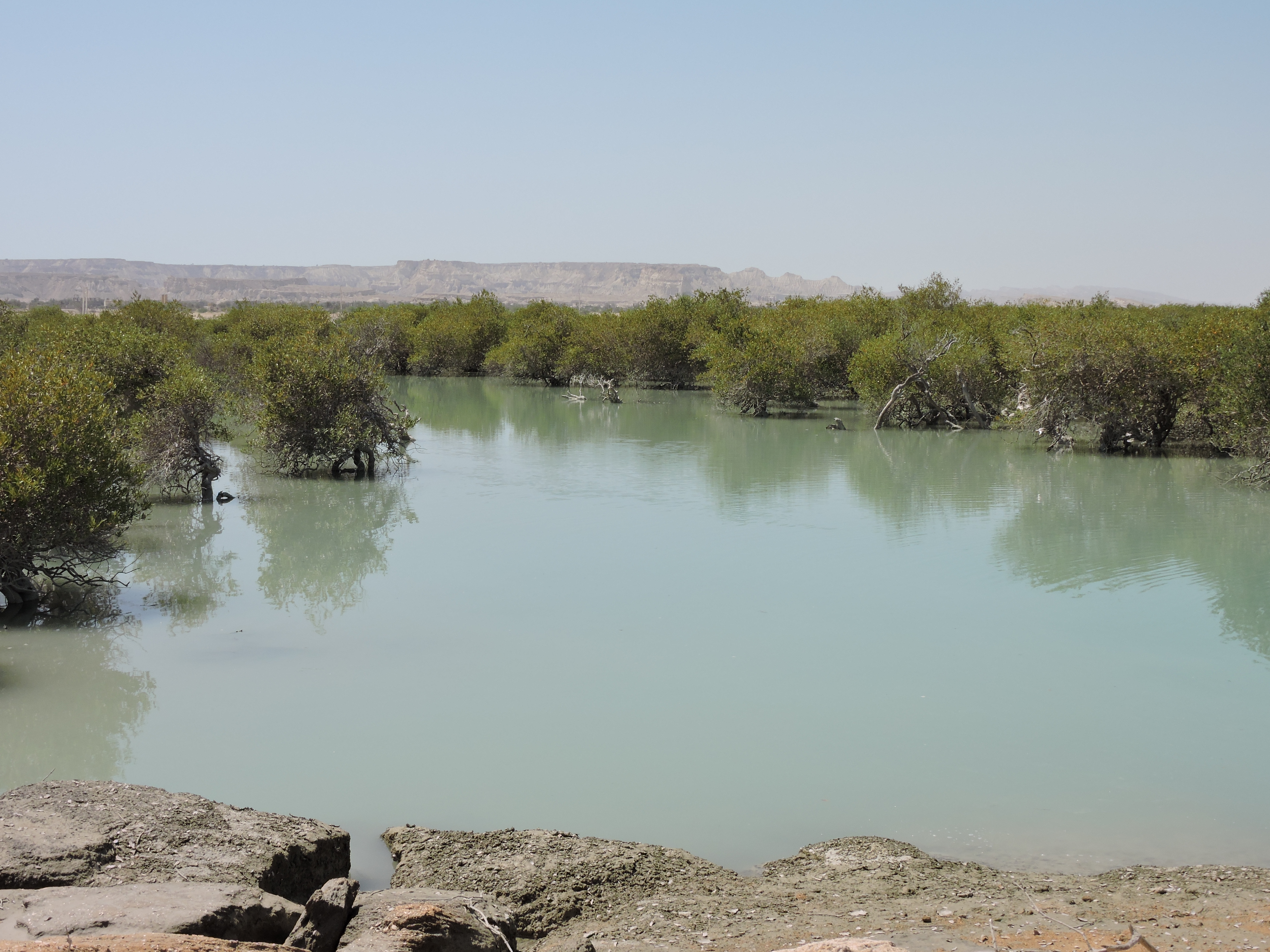

The Mangrove forests of Qeshm or Hara forests of Qeshm, are the mangrove forests on the southern coast of Iran, particularly on and near the island of Qeshm in the Persian Gulf. Dominated by the species Avicennia marina, known locally as the "harra" tree (Persian: حرا), the forests represent an ecological resource. The "Hara Protected Area" on Qeshm and the nearby mainland is a biosphere reserve where commercial use is restricted to fishing (mainly shrimp), tourist boat trips, and limited mangrove cutting for animal feed.

== Hara tree characteristics ==
The hara tree, Avicennia marina, grows to heights of three to eight meters and has bright green leaves and twigs. The long, narrow, oval leaves of the tree have nutritious value for livestock roughly equivalent to barley and alfalfa.

== Forest extent and significance ==
The hara forest on Qeshm and the opposite mainland covers an area of approximately 20 km by 20 km, with many tidal channels. In 1972 the Hara Protected Area was established to preserve suitable conditions for the growth and maintenance of the forests. The area is a habitat for migratory birds in the autumn and winter, and for reptiles, fish, and varieties of arthropoda and bivalves.

== Ecological characteristics ==
The Mangrove Biosphere Reserve is located in the Mehran River Delta in southern Iran. The area is located between Qeshm Island and the Persian Gulf and is a key focal point of biodiversity due to its mangrove ecosystem. The reserve is primarily a marine area. The main topographic features of the area include a lagoon with a series of small islands (similar to mud hills), mangrove forests, tidal marshes, and small, shallow bays. The reserve also hosts the largest mangrove ecosystem along the Persian Gulf coastline. Sea snakes use the aquatic habitats of the mangroves for feeding, reproduction, and livelihoods. Khoran Strait, where the reserve is located, is a Ramsar site that provides habitat for pelicans (Pelecanus crispus) during the winter months and serves as a regular feeding ground for green turtles (Chelonia mydas).

=== Fauna ===
The reserve is an important breeding ground for herons, especially the great egret, and species of Finch that pass through the area during migration. In winter, the protected wetland area is of particular importance as a feeding station for herons and Finch. The reserve is of further importance for wintering flocks of pelicans and greater flamingos.

== History ==
Centuries ago, Asian elephants (the Indian or Syrian elephant) once lived in the region of Qeshm and other regions of southern Iran.

== See also ==
- International Network of Geoparks
- List of national geoparks
