= Jenő Hámori (economist) =

Hungarian economist

Dr. Jenő Hámori, commonly referred to as J. Hamori, is a Hungarian economist. In 1973 he met with American and Italian economists in Bellagio and Budapest. In the 1980s he was a research fellow of the Institute for World Economics of the Hungarian Academy of Sciences. He has been outspoken for and published works related to the Korean and South American (Venezuela and Peru) economies.
