= Howmeh Rural District (Qeshm County) =

Rural district in Hormozgan province, Iran

Howmeh Rural District Persian: دهستان حومه
- Rural District
- Location within Iran
- Coordinates: 26°55′07″N 55°59′11″E
- Country: Iran
- Province: Hormozgan
- County: Qeshm
- District: Central
- Capital: Dargahan

Population (2016)
  - Total: 25,617
- Time zone: UTC+3:30 (IRST)

Howmeh Rural District (Persian: دهستان حومه) is in the Central District of Qeshm County, Hormozgan province, Iran. It is administered from the city of Dargahan.

== Demographics ==
=== Population ===
At the time of the 2006 National Census, the rural district's population was 22,141 in 4,745 households. There were 26,106 inhabitants in 6,288 households at the following census of 2011. The 2016 census measured the population of the rural district as 25,617 in 6,864 households. The most populous of its 13 villages was Tula, with 5,874 people.

== See also ==
Tonb-e Parsan, (Note: Formerly Tomban) a village in this rural district
