= Ramkan Rural District =

Rural district in Hormozgan province, Iran

Ramkan Rural District Persian: دهستان رمكان
- Rural District
- Location within Iran
- Coordinates: 26°50′09″N 56°01′03″E
- Country: Iran
- Province: Hormozgan
- County: Qeshm
- District: Central
- Capital: Turiyan

Population (2016)
  - Total: 24,135
- Time zone: UTC+3:30 (IRST)

Ramkan Rural District (Persian: دهستان رمكان) is in the Central District of Qeshm County, Hormozgan province, Iran. Its capital is the village of Turiyan. The previous capital of the rural district was the village of Ramkan, now a city.

== Demographics ==
=== Population ===
At the time of the 2006 National Census, the rural district's population was 13,472 in 2,815 households. There were 14,994 inhabitants in 3,517 households at the following census of 2011. The 2016 census measured the population of the rural district as 24,135 in 6,220 households. The most populous of its 17 villages was Holor, with 5,828 people.
