= Central District (Qeshm County) =

District in Hormozgan province, Iran

Central District (Qeshm County) Persian: بخش مرکزی شهرستان قشم
- District
- Location within Iran
- Coordinates: 26°55′00″N 56°04′23″E
- Country: Iran
- Province: Hormozgan
- County: Qeshm
- Capital: Qeshm

Population (2016)
  - Total: 104,955
- Time zone: UTC+3:30 (IRST)

The Central District of Qeshm County (Persian: بخش مرکزی شهرستان قشم) is in Hormozgan province, Iran. Its capital is the city of Qeshm.

== History ==
After the 2016 National Census, the villages of Laft and Ramkan were elevated to city status. In 2017, Larak Rural District was separated from Shahab District to join the Central District.

== Demographics ==
=== Population ===
At the time of the 2006 census, the district's population was 68,070 in 15,180 households. The following census in 2011 counted 78,369 people in 19,527 households. The 2016 census measured the population of the district as 104,955 inhabitants in 28,874 households.

=== Administrative divisions ===
Central District (Qeshm County) Population
Administrative Divisions	2006	2011	2016
Howmeh RD	22,141	26,106	25,617
Larak RD (Note: Transferred from Shahab District after the 2016 census)			
Ramkan RD	13,472	14,994	24,135
Dargahan (city)	7,996	8,667	14,525
Laft (city) (Note: Became a city after the 2016 census)			
Qeshm (city)	24,461	28,602	40,678
Ramkan (city) (Note: Became a city after the 2016 census)			
Total	68,070	78,369	104,955
RD = Rural District
