= Qeshm County =

County in Hormozgan province, Iran

Qeshm County Persian: شهرستان قشم
- County
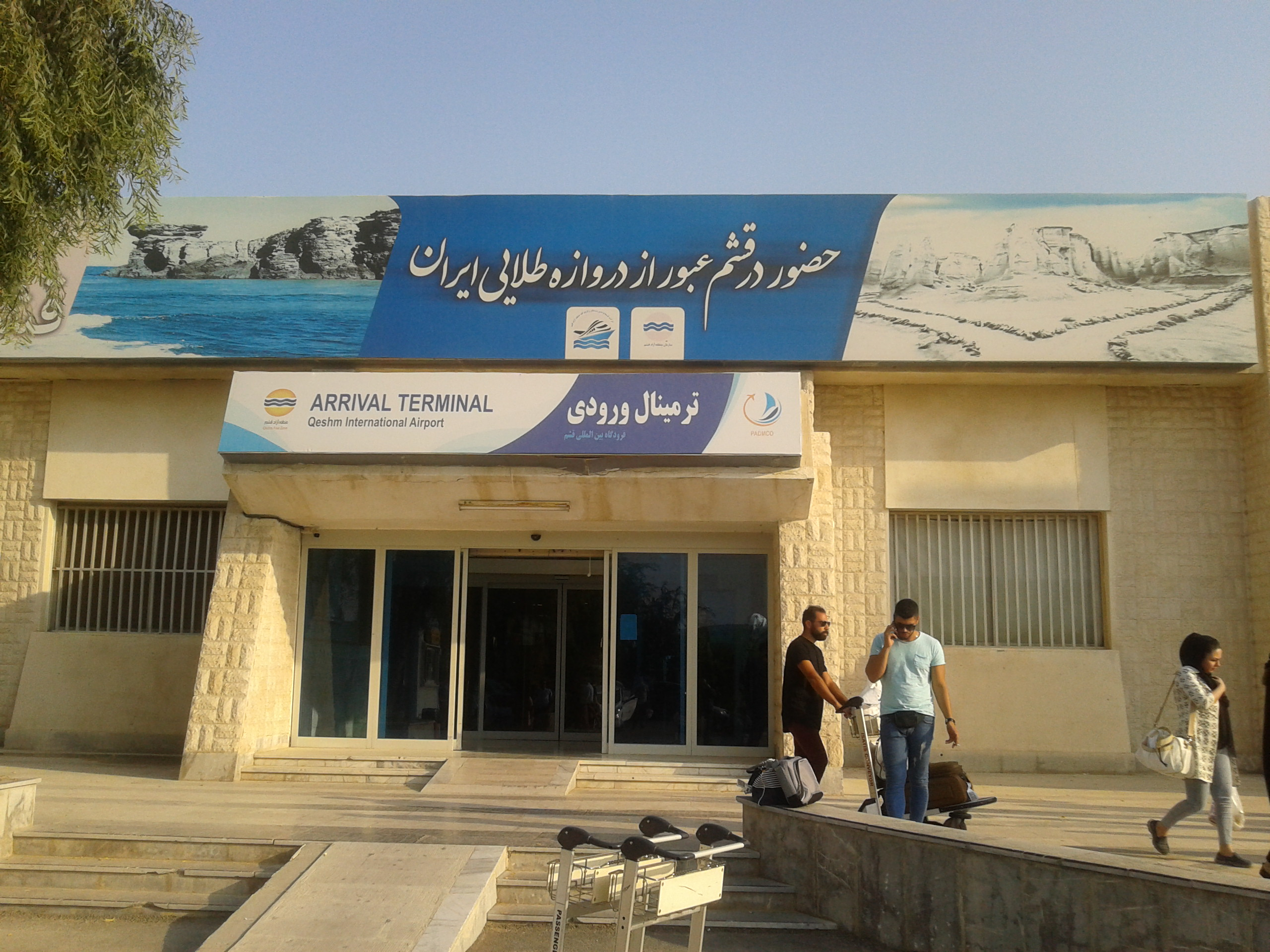
- Qeshm International Airport

- Location of Qeshm County in Hormozgan province (center, pink)

- Location of Hormozgan province in Iran
- Coordinates: 26°48′N 55°51′E
- Country: Iran
- Province: Hormozgan
- Capital: Qeshm
- Districts: Central, Hara, Shahab

Area
  - Total: 1,521 km^{2} (587 sq mi)

Population (2016)
  - Total: 148,993
  - Density: 97.96/km^{2} (253.7/sq mi)
- Time zone: UTC+3:30 (IRST)

Qeshm County (Persian: شهرستان قشم) is in Hormozgan province, Iran. It consists of three islands: Qeshm Island, Hengam Island and Larak Island. Its capital is the city of Qeshm. Qeshm is a free trade zone and has good potential for business.

== History ==
After the 2016 National Census, the villages of Laft and Ramkan were elevated to city status.

In 2017, Larak Rural District separated from Shahab District to join the Central District. In 2017, Dulab and Salakh Rural Districts were separated from Shahab District in the formation of Hara District. In 2019, Hormuz District was separated from the county to join Bandar Abbas County.

== Demographics ==
=== Population ===
At the time of the 2006 census, the county's population was 103,881 in 22,642 households. The following census in 2011 counted 117,774 people in 28,798 households. The 2016 census measured the population of the county as 148,993 in 40,506 households.

=== Administrative divisions ===
Qeshm County's population history and administrative structure over three consecutive censuses are shown in the following table.

Qeshm County Population
Administrative Divisions	2006	2011	2016
Central District	68,070	78,369	104,955
Howmeh RD	22,141	26,106	25,617
Larak RD (Note: Transferred from Shahab District after the 2016 census)			
Ramkan RD	13,472	14,994	24,135
Dargahan (city)	7,996	8,667	14,525
Laft (city) (Note: Became a city after the 2016 census)			
Qeshm (city)	24,461	28,602	40,678
Ramkan (city) (Note: Became a city after the 2016 census)			
Hara District (Note: Established after the 2016 census)			
Dulab RD			
Salakh RD			
Hormuz District (Note: Transferred to Bandar Abbas County after the 2016 census)	5,699	5,867	5,891
Hormuz (city)	5,699	5,867	5,891
Shahab District	30,112	33,538	38,115
Dulab RD	8,643	9,792	10,591
Hengam RD	475	417	521
Larak RD	466	473	421
Salakh RD	10,598	11,846	13,901
Suza RD	5,450	6,298	6,974
Suza (city)	4,480	4,712	5,707
Total	103,881	117,774	148,993
RD = Rural District

== See also ==
Media related to Qeshm County at Wikimedia Commons
