= 1997 Iran earthquake =

1997 Iran earthquake may refer to:

- 1997 Bojnurd earthquake
- 1997 Ardabil earthquake
- 1997 Qayen earthquake
