= List of earthquakes in 1997 =

Earthquakes in 1997
Approximate epicenters of the earthquakes in 1997
- 4.0–5.9 magnitude
- 6.0–6.9 magnitude
- 7.0–7.9 magnitude
- 8.0+ magnitude
- Strongest magnitude: 7.8 M_{w} Tonga; 7.8 M_{w} Russia
- Deadliest: 7.3 M_{w} Iran; 1,567 deaths
- Total fatalities: 3,069

Number by magnitude
- 9.0+: 0
- 8.0–8.9: 0
- 7.0–7.9: 7
- 6.0–6.9: 31

This is a list of earthquakes in 1997. Only earthquakes of magnitude 6 or above are included, unless they result in damage or casualties, or are notable for some other reason. All dates are listed according to UTC time. Maximum intensities are indicated on the Modified Mercalli intensity scale, and all data are sourced from the United States Geological Survey.

== By death toll ==
Rank	Death toll	Magnitude	Location	MMI	Depth (km)	Date	Event
1	1,567	7.3	Iran, Khorasan	X (Extreme)	10.0	May 10	1997 Qayen earthquake
2	1,100	6.1	Iran, Ardabil	IX (Violent)	10.0	February 28	1997 Ardabil earthquake
3	100	7.1	Pakistan, Harnai	VIII (Severe)	33.0	February 28	1997 Harnai earthquake
4	100	6.5	Iran, North Khorasan	VIII (Severe)	8.0	February 4	1997 Bojnurd earthquake
5	81	6.7	Venezuela, Sucre	VIII (Severe)	20.0	July 9	1997 Cariaco earthquake
6	38	5.8	India, Madhya Pradesh	VIII (Severe)	38.7	May 22	1997 Jabalpur earthquake
7	23	6.1	India, Mizoram	V (Moderate)	54.0	21 November	1997 Chittagong earthquake
7	18	5.9	Indonesia, Sulawesi	VI (Strong)	33.0	September 28	-
8	15	5.0	South Africa, North West Province	VII (Very Strong)	5.0	July 21	-
8	15	4.9	Pakistan, Khyber Pakhtunkhwa	IV (Light)	50.0	March 19	-
9	12	5.9	China, Xinjiang	VII (Very Strong)	33.0	January 21	1997 Jiashi earthquakes
10	11	6.0	Italy, Umbria	X (Extreme)	10.0	September 26	1997 Umbria and Marche earthquake

At least 10 dead.

== By magnitude ==
Rank	Death toll	Magnitude	Location	MMI	Depth (km)	Date
1	0	7.7	Vanuatu, Torba offshore	VII (Very Strong)	33.0	April 21
2	1,567	7.3	Iran, Qayen	X (Extreme)	10.0	May 10
3	1	7.2	Mexico, Michoacan	VIII (Severe)	33.0	January 11
4	100	7.1	Pakistan, Balochistan	VIII (Severe)	33.0	February 27
4	0	7.1	New Zealand, Kermadec Islands offshore	I (Not Felt)	332.7	May 25
4	0	7.1	Bolivia, Potosi	V (Moderate)	276.2	January 23
7	81	7.0	Venezuela, Sucre	VIII (Severe)	19.9	July 9

At least 7.0 magnitude.

== By month ==
=== January ===
January
- Strongest magnitude: 7.2 M_{w} Mexico
- Deadliest: 5.9 M_{w} China; 12 deaths
- Total fatalities: 13

Number by magnitude
- 8.0–8.9: 0
- 7.0–7.9: 2
- 6.0–6.9: 1

Date	Country and location	M_{w}	Depth (km)	MMI	Notes	Casualties	
Date	Country and location	M_{w}	Depth (km)	MMI	Notes	Dead	Injured
5	India, Uttarakhand	5.6	33.0	V	In neighboring Nepal, many houses were damaged in the western part of the country.	-	-
9	Kyrgyzstan, Naryn	5.8	22.2	VII	At least ten homes were destroyed and 400 others damaged.	-	-
11	Mexico, Michoacan	7.2	33.0	VIII	One person was killed and extensive damage occurred in Arteaga.	1	-
12	Albania, Fier	4.8	10.0	VI	More than 70 houses were damaged in Berat District.	-	-
21	China, Xinjiang	5.9	33.0	VII	Twelve people were killed, forty injured and 2,500 families were displaced during the 1997 Jiashi earthquakes. About 14,000 homes were destroyed, 17,000 additional homes damaged and 3,360 livestock were killed in Jiashi County.	12	40
22	United States, Northern California offshore	5.6	23.0	V	Slight damage occurred in Petrolia and Scotia.	-	-
22	Turkey, Hatay	5.7	10.0	VII	Five people were injured and ten houses were damaged at Antakya.	-	5
23	Bolivia, Potosí	7.1	276.2	V	-	-	
29	Vanuatu, Torba offshore	6.2	33.0	I	-	-	-

=== February ===
February
- Strongest magnitude: 7.1 M_{w} Pakistan
- Deadliest: 6.1 M_{w} Iran; 1,100 deaths
- Total fatalities: 1,300

Number by magnitude
- 8.0–8.9: 0
- 7.0–7.9: 1
- 6.0–6.9: 3

Date	Country and location	M_{w}	Depth (km)	MMI	Notes	Casualties	
Date	Country and location	M_{w}	Depth (km)	MMI	Notes	Dead	Injured
4	Iran, North Khorasan	6.5	10.0	IX	A hundred people lost their lives in this earthquake, and around 2,000 were injured in the 1997 Bojnurd earthquake. 5,500 houses were destroyed and 11,000 were damaged in Bojnurd.	100	2,000
7	Tonga, Pangai offshore	6.4	28.0	I	-	-	-
19	Colombia, Chocó	5.8	100.7	IV	Some minor damage to buildings was caused in Armenia and Pereira.	-	-
27	Pakistan, Balochistan	7.1	33.0	VIII	100 people died in the 1997 Harnai earthquake. Hundreds of others were injured and 500 homes were destroyed.	100	300+
28	Iran, Ardabil	6.1	10.0	IX	1,100 people were killed, 2,600 were injured and 12,000 houses were destroyed in the 1997 Ardabil earthquake.	1,100	2,600

=== March ===
March
- Strongest magnitude: 6.9 M_{w} Philippines
- Deadliest: 4.9 M_{w} Pakistan; 15 deaths
- Total fatalities: 17

Number by magnitude
- 8.0–8.9: 0
- 7.0–7.9: 0
- 6.0–6.9: 4

Date	Country and location	M_{w}	Depth (km)	MMI	Notes	Casualties	
Date	Country and location	M_{w}	Depth (km)	MMI	Notes	Dead	Injured
1	China, Xinjiang	5.6	22.4	VII	Two people were killed, six injured, 4,000 houses were destroyed and 738 livestock were killed in Jiashi County.	2	6
4	Japan, Shizuoka	5.6	10.0	VI	Three people were injured in Itō.	-	3
4	Pakistan, Balochistan	5.7	33.0	VI	One person was injured and damage occurred in Sibi.	-	1
6	Ghana, Accra	4.4	10.0	VI	Seven people were injured and power outages occurred in Accra.	-	7
11	Philippines, Mindanao offshore	6.9	10.0	V	Some damage occurred in Cagayan de Oro.	-	-
17	Indonesia, Banten offshore	6.4	33.0	VI	Some minor damage occurred in Jakarta.	-	-
19	Pakistan, Khyber Pakhtunkhwa	4.9	50.0	IV	15 people were killed, several others were injured and several houses were damaged in Bajaur.	15	Several
25	Chile, Región Metropolitana	5.5	84.0	VI	Some buildings were damaged, power outages and landslides occurred in Santiago.	-	-
26	United States, Alaska, Rat Islands offshore	6.7	33.0	IV	-	-	-
26	Lebanon, Beirut	5.0	10.0	VII	Fifty buildings were damaged in Beirut.	-	-
26	Brazil, Acre	6.1	602.6	I	-	-	-
26	Japan, Kyushu	6.1	10.0	IX	22 people were injured and many houses were damaged in Kagoshima Prefecture.	-	22

=== April ===
April
- Strongest magnitude: 7.7 M_{w} Vanuatu
- Deadliest: 6.2 M_{w} China; 9 deaths
- Total fatalities: 9

Number by magnitude
- 8.0–8.9: 0
- 7.0–7.9: 1
- 6.0–6.9: 10

Date	Country and location	M_{w}	Depth (km)	MMI	Notes	Casualties	
Date	Country and location	M_{w}	Depth (km)	MMI	Notes	Dead	Injured
1	Panama, south of	6.1	33.0	V	-	-	-
1	Chile, Tarapaca Region	6.2	113.8	V	Landslides and power outages occurred near the epicenter. This pair of earthquakes occurring only minutes apart can be considered a doublet earthquake.	-	-
1	Chile, Tarapaca Region	6.2	115.6	V	Landslides and power outages occurred near the epicenter. This pair of earthquakes occurring only minutes apart can be considered a doublet earthquake.	-	-
2	Trinidad and Tobago, Tobago offshore	6.1	45.0	V	It is a foreshock of the 6.7 quake on April 22. Slight damage was observed.	-	-
5	Papua New Guinea, Morobe	6.5	69.1	VI	-	-	-
6	China, Xinjiang	6.0	33.0	VI	It is a foreshock of the 6.2 quake 5 days later.	-	-
11	China, Xinjiang	6.2	15.0	VII	It is a largest of an earthquake swarm that started in January 21. At least 9 people were killed, 89 injured, 100,000 homeless, thousands of buildings were destroyed and 11,000 livestock killed in Jiashi County.	9	89
21	Vanuatu, Sola offshore	7.7	33.0	VII	A tsunami with a height of 3 m (9.8 ft) caused some damage to houses in Vanuatu and the Solomon Islands. On Funafuti, Tuvalu, and Suva, Fiji, a smaller tsunami was observed.	-	-
22	Trinidad and Tobago, Tobago offshore	6.7	5.0	VII	Three houses were destroyed and two people were injured.	-	2
23	Iran, Fars	4.8	33.0	IV	Some houses were damaged in the epicentral area.	-	-
23	Guam offshore	6.5	100.5	VII	Four people suffered injuries and some damage occurred on Guam.	-	4
28	South Africa, Prince Edward Islands offshore	6.8	10.0	I	-	-	-

=== May ===
May
- Strongest magnitude: 7.3 M_{w} Iran
- Deadliest: 7.3 M_{w} Iran; 1,567 deaths
- Total fatalities: 1,608

Number by magnitude
- 8.0–8.9: 0
- 7.0–7.9: 2
- 6.0–6.9: 7

Date	Country and location	M_{w}	Depth (km)	MMI	Notes	Casualties	
Date	Country and location	M_{w}	Depth (km)	MMI	Notes	Dead	Injured
1	Mexico, Jalisco offshore	6.9	33.0	I	-	-	-
3	New Zealand, Kermadec Islands offshore	6.9	108.3	I	-	-	-
8	India, Manipur	6.0	34.9	VII	Several people were injured and some damage occurred in Sylhet, Bangladesh.	-	Several
10	Iran, Qayen	7.3	10.0	X	The 1997 Qayen earthquake. caused severe damage throughout eastern Iran. 1,567 people were killed and 2,300 injured, including five in Afghanistan. However, this figure may be as high as 2,394.	1,567	2,300
11	West Chile Rise	6.5	10.0	I	-	-	-
13	Japan, Kyushu	6.1	33.0	VIII	34 people were injured and five houses were destroyed in Kyushu.	-	34
13	Iran, Qayen	4.5	10.0	V	It was an aftershock of the 7.3 earthquake on May 10, One person was killed and further damage was caused.	1	-
13	Afghanistan, Hindu Kush region	6.5	196.0	IV	One person was injured in Kabul. Another was killed and eleven others injured in Peshawar, Pakistan.	1	12
17	China, Xinjiang	4.9	33.0	IV	One person was injured in Jiashi County.	-	1
21	Vanuatu, Isangel offshore	6.8	57.0	VI	-	-	-
21	India, Madhya Pradesh	5.8	36.0	VIII	The 1997 Jabalpur earthquake caused major damage, killing 38 and injuring a thousand others.	38	1,000
21	Spain, Galicia	5.4	18.8	VII	One person died of a heart attack and minor damage was caused in Galicia.	1	-
22	Mexico, Michoacan	6.5	70.0	VI	Many houses were damaged at Arteaga and a church were damaged at Patzcuaro, Michoacan.	-	-
22	Philippines, Babuyan Islands offshore	6.1	33.9	VI	-	-	-
25	New Zealand, Kermadec Islands offshore	7.1	332.7	I	-	-	-

=== June ===
June
- Strongest magnitude: 6.5 M_{w} Southeast Pacific Rise
- Total fatalities: 0

Number by magnitude
- 8.0–8.9: 0
- 7.0–7.9: 0
- 6.0–6.9: 3

Date	Country and location	M_{w}	Depth (km)	MMI	Notes	Casualties	
Date	Country and location	M_{w}	Depth (km)	MMI	Notes	Dead	Injured
10	Southern East Pacific Rise	6.5	10.0	I	-	-	-
12	Papua New Guinea, Lae	6.1	33.0	VI	-	-	-
17	United States, Alaska, Aleutian Islands offshore	6.4	33.0	IV	-	-	-
17	Argentina, Santiago del Estero	5.6	28.2	VI	Minor damage occurred in Tucuman Province.	-	-
20	Iran, Qayen	5.6	10.0	VII	These earthquakes destroyed 160 homes and damaged 5,000 others in Qayen.	-	-
25	Iran, Qayen	5.9	10.0	VII	These earthquakes destroyed 160 homes and damaged 5,000 others in Qayen.	-	-
25	Japan, Yamaguchi	5.9	10.0	VII	One person was injured in Yamaguchi Prefecture. A landslide occurred in Masuda.	-	1
30	United States, Hawaii	5.1	8.5	VIII	Slight damage was caused and power outages occurred in Hilo.	-	-

=== July ===
June
- Strongest magnitude: 7.0 M_{w} Venezuela
- Deadliest: 7.0 M_{w} Venezuela; 81 deaths
- Total fatalities: 96

Number by magnitude
- 8.0–8.9: 0
- 7.0–7.9: 1
- 6.0–6.9: 4

Date	Country and location	M_{w}	Depth (km)	MMI	Notes	Casualties	
Date	Country and location	M_{w}	Depth (km)	MMI	Notes	Dead	Injured
6	Chile, Coquimbo offshore	6.8	19.0	VI	-	-	-
6	Honduras, Cortes offshore	6.1	33.0	VI	-	-	-
9	Venezuela, Sucre	7.0	19.9	VIII	81 people were killed and 683 injured in the 1997 Cariaco earthquake. Extensive damage and landslides occurred.	81	683
11	Indonesia, Java offshore	6.0	574.4	I	-	-	-
14	Japan, Hokkaido offshore	6.1	33.0	V	-	-	-
18	Azerbaijan, Ganja Qazakh	4.2	33.0	III	5,000 houses were damaged in Noyemberyan, Armenia.	-	-
19	Mexico, Oaxaca	6.9	33.0	VII	-	-	-
21	South Africa, North West Province	5.0	5.0	VII	Fifteen people were killed and 46 were injured due to a mine collapse near Stilfontein.	15	46

=== August ===
August
- Strongest magnitude: 6.6 M_{w} Papua New Guinea
- Total fatalities: 0

Number by magnitude
- 8.0–8.9: 0
- 7.0–7.9: 0
- 6.0–6.9: 11

Date	Country and location	M_{w}	Depth (km)	MMI	Notes	Casualties	
Date	Country and location	M_{w}	Depth (km)	MMI	Notes	Dead	Injured
8	Turkey, Erzurum	4.5	10.0	V	One person was injured and seven houses were destroyed in Koprukoy.	-	1
10	Australia, Western Australia	6.3	10.0	VIII	-	-	-
13	China, Chongqing	4.8	37.2	V	Some damage was caused in Chongqing.	-	-
20	Indonesia, Aceh	6.0	33.0	VI	Several hundred houses were destroyed in Aceh.	-	-
24	Iran, Fars	5.0	33.0	IV	67 people were injured in Firuzabad.	-	67
29	Papua New Guinea, East Sepik	6.6	22.8	VI	-	-	-

=== September ===
September
- Strongest magnitude: 7.0 M_{w} New Zealand
- Deadliest: 5.9 M_{w} Indonesia; 18 deaths
- Total fatalities: 29

Number by magnitude
- 8.0–8.9: 0
- 7.0–7.9: 1
- 6.0–6.9: 10

Date	Country and location	M_{w}	Depth (km)	MMI	Notes	Casualties	
Date	Country and location	M_{w}	Depth (km)	MMI	Notes	Dead	Injured
2	Colombia, Tolima	6.8	198.7	V	-	-	-
4	Fiji offshore	6.8	624.7	I	-	-	-
15	Philippines, Mindanao	6.2	50.7	V	-	-	-
17	United States, Arkansas	3.8	0.1	V	Small items were knocked off shelves in Lepanto.	-	-
20	New Zealand, Kermadec Islands offshore	7.0	30.0	I	-	-	-
26	Italy, Umbria	5.8	10.0	VIII	1997 Umbria and Marche earthquake: 11 people were killed and more than 100 were injured. Major damage was reported.	11	100
26	Italy, Umbria	6.0	10.0	X	1997 Umbria and Marche earthquake: 11 people were killed and more than 100 were injured. Major damage was reported.	11	100
28	Indonesia, Sulawesi	5.9	33.0	VI	At least 18 people killed, over 300 injured and 650 houses and buildings destroyed in the Parepare-Pinrang area.	18	300

=== October ===
October
- Strongest magnitude: 7.8 M_{w} Tonga
- Deadliest: 7.1 M_{w} Chile; 8 deaths
- Total fatalities: 8

Number by magnitude
- 8.0–8.9: 0
- 7.0–7.9: 3
- 6.0–6.9: 8

Date	Country and location	M_{w}	Depth (km)	MMI	Notes	Casualties	
Date	Country and location	M_{w}	Depth (km)	MMI	Notes	Dead	Injured
3	Italy, Umbria	5.3	10.0	VII	It is an aftershock of the 1997 Umbria and Marche earthquake. Further damage was caused and 20 people were injured.	-	20
3	Iran, Fars	5.3	33.0	V	Six people injured and several houses damaged in the epicentral area.	-	6
6	Philippines, Mindanao	6.5	105.6	V	-	-	-
13	Greece, Peloponnese	6.4	24.0	VI	Minor damage occurred in southern Peloponnese.	-	-
14	Tonga, south of Tongatapu	7.8	167.3	VII	-	-	-
14	Italy, Umbria	5.5	10.0	VIII	One person was injured and further damage was caused to buildings already weakened by the September 26 event. Slight damage occurred in Rome.	-	1
14	Chile, Coquimbo	7.1	58.0	VII	The 1997 Punitaqui earthquake caused eight deaths (five in Pueblo Nuevo, and one each in La Chimba, Punitaqui, and Coquimbo) and 400 injuries. More than 20,700 houses were damaged or destroyed.	8	400
28	Peru, Amazonas	7.2	112.0	VII	Slight damage occurred in Chachapoyas.	-	-

=== November ===
November
- Strongest magnitude: 7.5 M_{w} China
- Deadliest: 6.1 M_{w} India; 23 deaths
- Total fatalities: 24

Number by magnitude
- 8.0–8.9: 0
- 7.0–7.9: 3
- 6.0–6.9: 9

Date	Country and location	M_{w}	Depth (km)	MMI	Notes	Casualties	
Date	Country and location	M_{w}	Depth (km)	MMI	Notes	Dead	Injured
3	Turkey, Bitlis	4.8	33.0	IV	Two people were injured and seven houses were destroyed in Bitlis.	-	2
3	Chile, Coquimbo	6.2	45.0	VI	It is an aftershock of the 1997 Punitaqui earthquake. Further damage was caused and landslides occurred in the epicentral area.	-	-
5	Greece, Central Greece	5.6	23.8	VI	Power outages occurred in the Galaxidion-Itea area.	-	-
6	Canada, Quebec	4.8	22.5	V	One person died of a heart attack.	1	-
8	China, Tibet	7.5	33.0	VII	1997 Manyi earthquake	-	-
8	El Salvador, Cabañas	6.5	176.4	IV	-	-	-
14	Taiwan, Hualien	5.2	33.0	IV	One person was injured by a landslide in a highway between Hualien and Su'ao.	-	1
15	Japan, Hokkaido	6.1	161.0	IV	-	-	-
15	Vanuatu, Sanma offshore	7.0	123.1	VI	-	-	-
15	Greece, Ionian Islands offshore	6.6	33.0	VII	Several people injured and considerable damage to buildings at Amalias, Gargalianoi, Kalamai, Kiparissia, Meligalas, Pirgos and other parts of western Peloponnisos. One house destroyed on Zakinthos.	-	Several
21	India, Mizoram	6.1	54.4	V	Despite being centered in Mizoram, India, the 1997 Chittagong earthquake caused damage in neighboring Bangladesh. 23 people were killed and another 200 were injured when a five-story building collapsed in Chittagong. Damage was also observed in other parts of the country.	23	200
25	Indonesia, Gorontalo	7.0	24.0	VI	At least 90 buildings were damaged in Gorontalo.	-	-
28	Bolivia, La Paz	6.7	586.0	I	-	-	-

=== December ===
December
- Strongest magnitude: 7.8 M_{w} Russia
- Total fatalities: 0

Number by magnitude
- 8.0–8.9: 0
- 7.0–7.9: 2
- 6.0–6.9: 11

Date	Country and location	M_{w}	Depth (km)	MMI	Notes	Casualties	
Date	Country and location	M_{w}	Depth (km)	MMI	Notes	Dead	Injured
5	Russia, Kamchatka	7.8	33.0	VII	The 1997 Kamchatka earthquake caused a tsunami with heights of about 8 m (26 ft). The tsunami was also observed in Hawaii and Alaska.	-	-
11	Colombia, Tolima	6.4	177.5	IV	Minor damage occurred in Cali.	-	-
17	United States, Alaska, Rat Islands offshore	6.6	20.0	IV	-	-	-
22	Papua New Guinea, Morobe	7.2	179.3	VI	Some minor damage was reported in Lae.	-	-
