= 1997 Umbria–Marche earthquakes =

Mw5.7 and Mw6.0 earthquakes in central Italy

1997 Umbria and Marche earthquakes
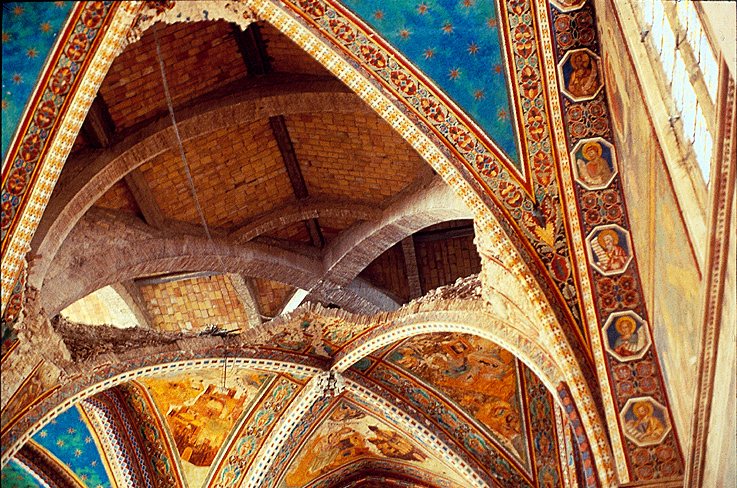
- Photo of the partially collapsed ceiling vault of the Basilica of Saint Francis of Assisi after the earthquake

- Location within Italy
- UTC time: 1997-09-26 09:40:26
- ISC event: 1043512
- USGS-ANSS: ComCat
- Local date: 26 September 1997
- Local time: 11:40
- Magnitude: 6.0 M_{w}
- Depth: 10 km (6.2 mi)
- Epicenter: 43.084°N 12.812°E
- Areas affected: Italy (Umbria, Marche)
- Max. intensity: MMI X (Extreme)
- Casualties: 12 dead 150 injured

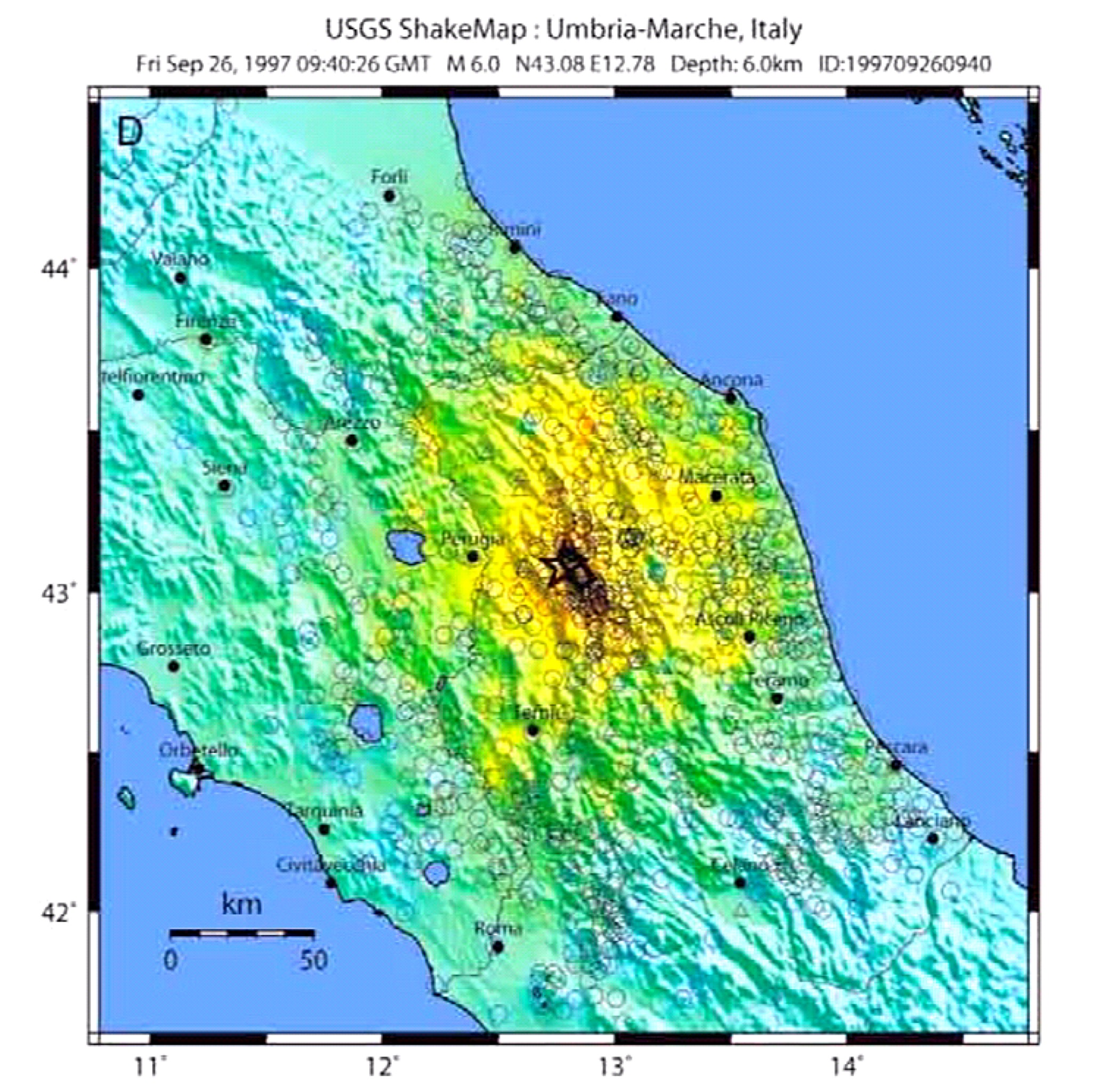
Shake map

The 1997 Umbria and Marche earthquakes occurred in the regions of Umbria and Marche, central Italy over a period of several months from September 1997 to April 1998. It consisted of eight earthquakes with magnitudes greater than M_{w} 5. The first of the larger shocks, which measured M_{w} 5.7, occurred at 02:33 CEST (00:33 UTC) on 26 September 1997. It was preceded by several foreshocks, beginning with a M_{w} 4.5 event on 3 September. A second and slightly larger shock occurred about nine hours later at 11:40 CEST (09:40 UTC), rated M_{w} 6.0. The epicentres of first two larger earthquakes were in Annifo. The shaking associated with first two larger shocks was estimated at VIII (Severe) and X (Extreme) on the Mercalli intensity scale, respectively.

There were several thousands of foreshocks and aftershocks from May 1997 to April 1998, more than thirty of which had a magnitude more than 3.5. Eleven people died and approximately 100 were injured, with significant damage to buildings including the partial collapse of the ceiling vault in the Basilica of Saint Francis of Assisi. The earthquakes occurred along faults oriented parallel to the Apennine Mountains and demonstrated how seismic events can influence subsequent earthquakes through alterations in stresses within the upper crust.

== Tectonic setting ==
The Central Apennines are currently undergoing southwest–northeast directed extension. This has resulted in a series of northwest–southeast trending normal faults and associated sedimentary basins, mainly half-graben in type. The current period of extensional tectonics began in the Pliocene, replacing the previously active thrust tectonics that had resulted from collision between the Apennine continental lithosphere (rifted off Eurasia) and the Adriatic plate. The current extension is thought to be caused by trench rollback of Adriatic oceanic lithosphere. The earlier set of thrust faults also have a northwest–southeast trend and some of these structures may have been directly reactivated during the subsequent extension.

== Earthquake sequence ==
This sequence of earthquakes ran from September 1997 to April 1998, including a series of foreshocks, eight major shocks (M_{w} > 5.0) and several thousand aftershocks. The sequence began with a M_{w} 4.5 foreshock on 3 September in Cesi. This was followed by a large number of smaller events, representing 23 days of continuous seismic activity, right up to the first of the major shocks on 26 September. Most of the foreshocks were located in the area between the epicentres of the two mainshocks that occurred that day.

Thousands of aftershocks were recorded by both permanent and temporary seismic networks, the latter installed shortly after the 26 September main shocks. The distribution of these aftershocks outlined a fault zone about 40 km long, running in a northwest-to-southeast direction, and extending about 5 to 15 km across. The sequence consisted of multiple distinct rupture episodes rather than a single main event followed by gradually decreasing aftershocks. After the two largest shocks on 26 September, the immediate aftershocks clustered differently for each event: those following the first shock concentrated east of its epicentre, while aftershocks after the second, larger event appeared predominantly to the north. This pattern indicates that the two main shocks ruptured adjacent fault segments and that the rupture propagated in opposite directions.

These earthquakes occurred along normal faults oriented parallel to the Apennine Mountains and dipping gently towards the southwest. This fault type is characteristic of areas experiencing crustal stretching, known as an extensional tectonic regime. A feature of the 1997 sequence was that the faults involved dipped at unusually shallow angles (30° to 45°). Typically, faults in similar geological settings dip more steeply. This unusually low angle suggests either an atypical arrangement of underground stresses, called a non-Andersonian stress regime, or possibly the reactivation of older faults formed under compression but now slipping under extension due to high-pressure fluid conditions within the Earth's crust.

In this summary table, only the largest foreshock and other shocks with magnitude M_{w} 5.0 or higher are listed:

Date (YYYY-MM-DD)	Time (UTC)	Latitude	Longitude	Depth (km)	Magnitude (M_{w})
1997-09-03	22:07:29	43.012° N	12.879° E	4.0 km (2 mi)	4.5
1997-09-26	00:33:12	43.020° N	12.888° E	6.5 km (4 mi)	5.7
1997-09-26	09:40:26	43.030° N	12.859° E	6.0 km (4 mi)	6.0
1997-10-03	08:55:21	43.034° N	12.836° E	5.0 km (3 mi)	5.2
1997-10-06	23:24:52	43.017° N	12.836° E	5.5 km (3 mi)	5.4
1997-10-12	11:08:36	42.913° N	12.946° E	5.0 km (3 mi)	5.2
1997-10-14	15:23:10	42.921° N	12.925° E	5.5 km (3 mi)	5.6
1998-03-26	16:26:11	43.134° N	12.803° E	47.0 km (29 mi)	5.3
1998-04-03	07:26:36	43.180° N	12.779° E	6.0 km (4 mi)	5.1

== Fault interaction and triggering of earthquakes ==
Studies of the 1997 sequence revealed that the earthquakes significantly influenced one another by altering stresses in the upper crust, known as static stress changes. For example, the initial small earthquake in early September slightly increased stress at the location where the first major earthquake later occurred. Moreover, the pattern of smaller earthquakes following the initial foreshock closely matched areas experiencing increased stress. Stress analyses demonstrated that each major earthquake increased the likelihood of subsequent earthquakes along faults aligned with the Apennine direction by raising a parameter known as the Coulomb stress, a combined measure of changes in both shear stress (the sliding force on a fault) and normal stress (the pressure acting perpendicular to the fault surface).

However, certain moderate earthquakes occurring very close to the main earthquake hypocentres in October 1997 could not be easily explained by Coulomb stress increases alone. Instead, these events seem to have been promoted by an increase in extensional stress, effectively unclamping faults and reducing friction, even though the sliding forces (shear stresses) decreased. This unclamping could have facilitated fluid movement within the fault zones, potentially explaining why these earthquakes happened in places where standard stress calculations predicted they would be less likely.

== Impact ==
=== Context ===
Assisi and its surrounding area are a major tourist destination, with visitors drawn to its religious artefacts, buildings and art. The towns and villages have retained much of their medieval form, including many buildings of stone masonry, which, while adding to their character, makes them vulnerable to earthquakes. This vulnerability, combined with the area's cultural heritage, made the impact of the earthquakes greater than would have been expected to result from the shaking caused by such moderate magnitude events.

=== Damage ===
The 3 September foreshock caused some damage in the Cesi area, forcing many houses to be evacuated. Damage associated with the two 26 September earthquakes was concentrated in an area of about 40 km x 10 km, running NNW–SSE, straddling the border between the regions of Umbria and Marche. A total of about 100,000 buildings were damaged, >30,000 suffering severe damage, including >2,000 churches. The majority of buildings in the Frazione of Collecurti, Cesi and Colli di Verchiano, close to the epicentre, were completely destroyed (estimated shaking of IX–X on the Mercalli–Cancani–Siebert scale (MCS)). The historical towns that lay further from the epicentre were less affected (Fabriano (VI–VII), Camerino (VI–VII), Foligno (VII), Nocera Umbra (VII–VIII) and Sellano (VIII)).

Most of the buildings in the area affected by the earthquakes were masonry built. These were of variable resistance to seismic shaking, depending on the degree to which walls were tied to floors and roofs. A significant number of masonry buildings had been retrofitted to be more resistant following previous earthquake. There were also a small number of buildings constructed from reinforced concrete.

Many of the better-quality masonry buildings in the historic towns performed quite well during the earthquake because of the use of iron ties connecting walls to floors. The less well-constructed buildings in the towns, and more widely in the villages and the countryside, suffered heavy damage. This resulted from low-quality masonry walls being unconnected to either roofs or floors. Buildings that had benefitted from retrofitting performed better, although there was still significant damage due to the generally poor quality of the work carried out. The few reinforced concrete buildings performed relatively well, despite, in most cases, not being designed to meet modern seismic building codes.

The total estimated loss was reckoned to be at least $4.5bn.

=== Casualties ===
The death toll of 11, with a further 126 injured, is less than would be expected considering the degree of damage caused. This is thought to mainly be a result of the first less damaging shock, early on the morning of 26 September, causing most inhabitants to abandon their homes, particularly after a warning of the danger of aftershocks broadcast by the Ministry of Civil Protection. Four of the deaths occurred in the Basilica of San Francesco in Assisi, the victims being amongst a group of 30 people inspecting damage caused by the first shock when the vault collapsed during the second. Additionally two elderly couples were killed when their homes collapsed and a further three died from heart attacks.

== Aftermath ==
=== Emergency response ===
90,000 homes were abandoned, leaving 130,000 people temporarily homeless. The emergency response was organised by the Civil Defence, involving units from across the country, including Fire Brigades, with 4,500 of their staff and 2,000 volunteers. Together they provided temporary accommodation, and worked on securing partially damaged structures. They also surveyed the damage and controlled access to the most affected areas that remained unsafe. Within a few weeks a significant proportion of the affected population were able to return to their houses, but villages near the epicentre and the central part of Nocera Umbria remained closed off.

=== Implications for regional seismic hazard ===
Analysis of stress changes from the 1997 earthquakes suggested they increased crustal stress near the locations of several historical earthquakes. In particular, areas affected by historical seismic events such as the earthquake near Norcia in 1328 and earthquakes in 1747 and 1751 experienced increased stresses due to the 1997 sequence. Although the exact locations and fault orientations for these historical earthquakes are uncertain, the increased stress implies a possible elevation in seismic risk for these historically affected regions.

These findings highlight the importance of studying how earthquakes interact through changes in crustal stresses. Such stress interactions can influence not only immediate aftershocks but also potentially accelerate the occurrence of future significant earthquakes. The detailed understanding of fault interactions gained from events like the 1997 Umbria–Marche earthquakes contributes to assessing and managing seismic hazard in earthquake-prone regions.

== See also ==
- List of earthquakes in 1997
- List of earthquakes in Italy
- Earthquake engineering
