= Chalaki =

Chalaki may refer to:

- Chalaki, Golestan (Persian: چالکی, Chālakī)
- Chalaki, Razavi Khorasan (Persian: چالاکی, Chālākī)
