= 1997 Bojnurd earthquake =

Earthquake affecting Iran and Turkmenistan

- UTC time: 1997-02-04 10:37:47
- ISC event: 1009575
- USGS-ANSS: ComCat
- Local date: 4 February 1997
- Local time: 14:07 IRST
- Duration: 5 seconds
- Magnitude: 6.5 M_{w}
- Depth: 16.8 km (10 mi)
- Epicenter: 37.68°N 57.27°E
- Type: Strike-slip
- Areas affected: Iran
- Total damage: >$US 30 million
- Max. intensity: MMI VIII (Severe)
- Peak acceleration: 0.3 g
- Foreshocks: M_{w} 5.4
- Casualties: 88–100 dead, 1,948 injured

The 1997 Bojnurd earthquake (also known as the Garmkhan earthquake) occurred on 4 February at 14:07 IRST in Iran. The epicenter of the M_{w} 6.5 earthquake was in the Kopet Dag mountains of North Khorasan, near the Iran–Turkmenistan border, about 579 km (360 mi) northeast of Tehran. The earthquake is characterized by shallow strike-slip faulting in a zone of active faults. Seismic activity is present as the Kopet Dag is actively accommodating tectonics through faulting. The earthquake left 88 dead, 1,948 injured, and affected 173 villages, including four which were destroyed. Damage also occurred in Shirvan and Bojnord counties. The total cost of damage was estimated to be over US$ 30 million. (Note: This would cost ~US$55.6 million in 2022.)

== Background and tectonics ==
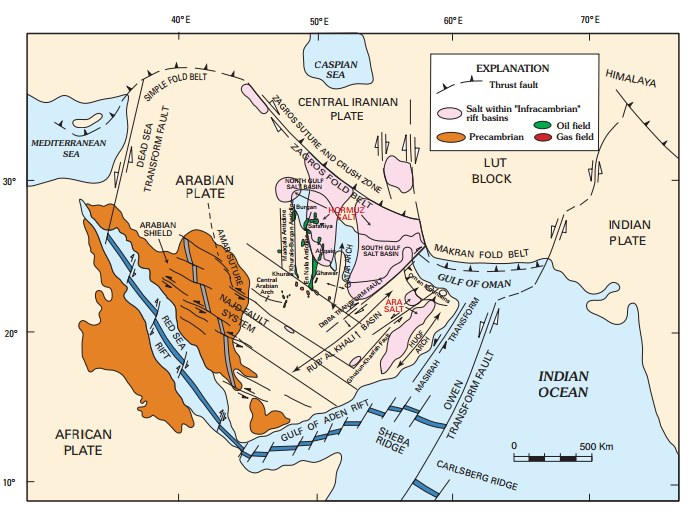
The tectonic setting of Iran and surrounding area

The geology of Iran is dominated by convergence tectonics between the Eurasian plate and terranes from Gondwana. Two major collisional events occurred; the Cimmerian orogeny which began after the Paleo-Tethys Ocean closed (Late Triassic or Early Jurassic), and the Alpine orogeny after closing the Tethys Ocean (Late Eocene).

Present-day seismic activity indicate tectonic deformation is being accommodated along the Zagros, Alborz and Kopet Dag mountains. Deformation is also accommodated in eastern and central Iran, as well as in the Dasht-e Lut, in the form of tectonic blocks. The Arabian shield moves northwards at approximately 23 mm (0.91 in) per year, where the Zagros fold and thrust belt accommodates roughly half of it. Meanwhile, the rest is distributed across the Alborz, Kopet Dag and central Caspian Sea. In southern Iran, this motion is partially accommodated by the Makran Trench subduction zone. In eastern Iran (south of the Kopet Dag), north–south trending right-lateral strike-slip faults in a 400 km (250 mi)-wide shear zone accommodate the motion.

The northern Kopet Dag range front marks a linear boundary with the Turan platform (part of the Eurasian plate). The Kopet Dag mountains consist of Mesozoic to Tertiary sedimentary rocks, and represent the closure of the Tethys Ocean, which closed when northeastern Iran was sutured to the tectonically stable Turan platform. The north–east convergence in northeastern Iran occurs obliquely with respect to the northwest–southeast trending Kopet Dag. Oblique convergence is accommodated by thrust faulting, and strike-slip faulting along a shear zone termed the Central Kopet Dag Shear Zone within the range. The northwestern Kopet Dag accommodates convergence with thrusting and minor left-lateral faulting. In the eastern Kopet Dag, north of Bojnurd, right-lateral strike-slip faulting occurs. Right-lateral faults have been observed displacing the mountain belt.

== Historical seismicity ==
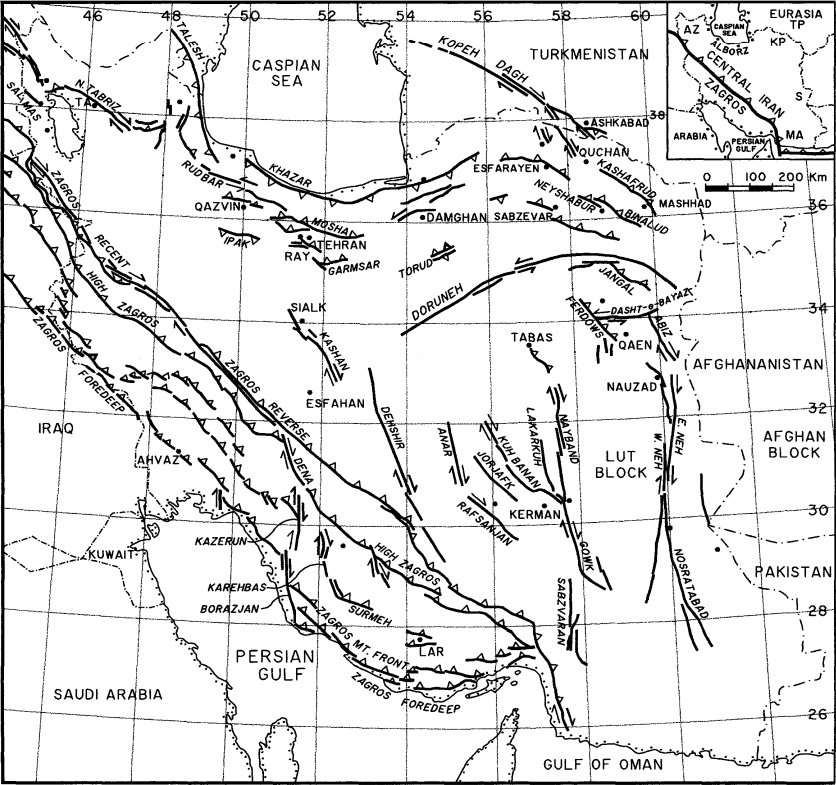
A map of major faults in Iran

Northeastern Iran is rich in historical records of earthquakes due to its geographical importance in trade between Europe and Asia. Earthquakes in the region have been recorded for over 2,000 years. Among the most damaging were the earthquakes at nearby Quchan in 1851 (M 6.9), 1871–72 (M 7.0–7.1), 1893 (M 7.1), and 1895 (M 6.8). In the 20th century, two earthquakes in 1929 (M 7.4) and 1948 (M 7.2) were also destructive.

The Ashkabad Fault, a right-lateral strike-slip structure, runs linear to the northern Kopet Dag front range. It is believed to have produced up to 35 km (22 mi) of strike-slip displacement. Between Bojnord and Quchan is a zone of north-northwest–south-southeast trending right-lateral strike-slip faults that cuts through the mountains. This zone is known as the Bakharden–Quchan Fault Zone (BQFZ). Faults of the BQFZ were responsible for strong earthquakes near Bojnurd from 1997 to 2000. Seismicity is restricted to the shallow continental crust no deeper than 30 km (19 mi), and displays thrust and strike-slip focal mechanisms. A magnitude 7.2 earthquake in 1948 may have been associated with this fault zone.

== Earthquake ==
An analysis of body wave from the mainshock indicated strike-slip faulting with some vertical component. Using teleseismic instruments, the epicenter was calculated to be slightly west of where the fault and area of destruction was located. The rupture occurred along a 15 km (9.3 mi)-long right-lateral strike-slip fault. Based on the distribution of aftershocks, the source fault is oriented north-northwest–south-southeast, and slightly concave to the east. A rupture initiated on the northern part of the fault and propagated southwards along its strike for five seconds. The fault produced an average displacement of 0.5–1.0 m (1 ft 8 in – 3 ft 3 in). This style and orientation of faulting is consistent with past earthquakes in the region.

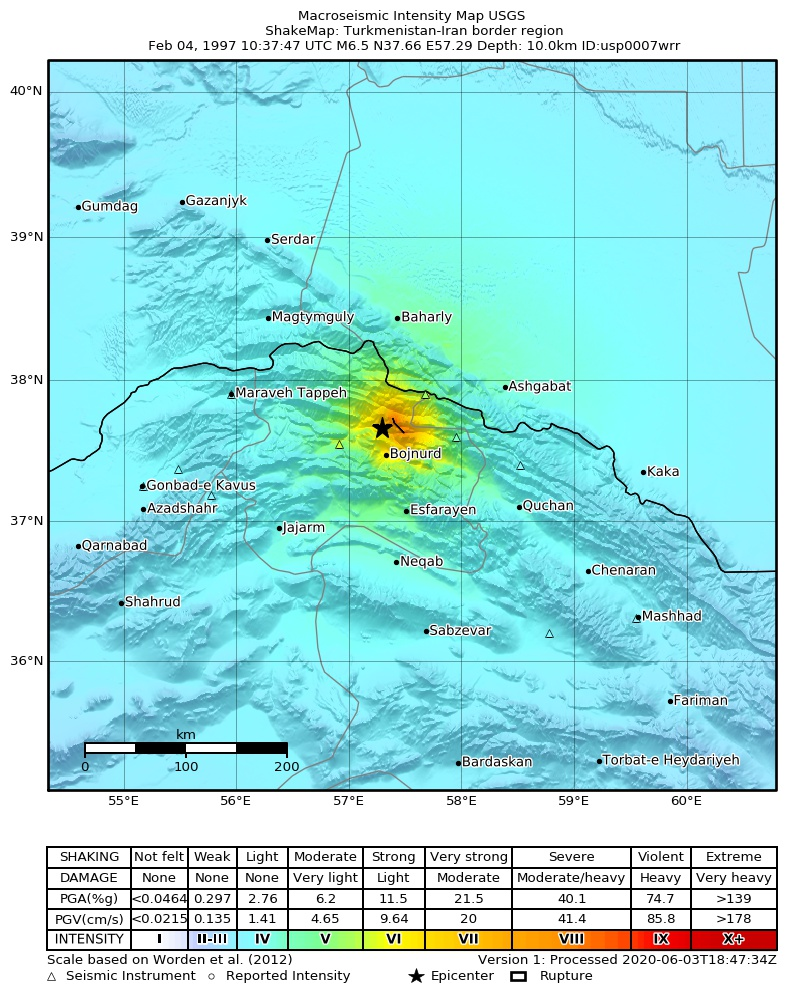
A strong ground motion map show shaking intensity

Based on the extent of damage, a maximum Modified Mercalli intensity of VIII (Severe) was assigned to affected places within a 10 km (6.2 mi) radius around the epicenter. The destruction of and serious damage to single-storey structures was evident of high-frequency seismic waves released during the rupture. A peak ground acceleration (pga) of 0.3 g was estimated near the epicenter. The city of Bojnurd experienced a pga of 0.2 g. The southward-propagating rupture caused unusually great devastation to areas relatively distant from the rupture. In the village of Sheikh, residents recalled violent shaking, rockfalls and heavy destruction. The aftershock distribution and absence of surface ruptures indicated the rupture ceased 10–15 km (6.2–9.3 mi) away from Sheikh, yet the village was destroyed. This was attributed to the directivity of an enhanced shear wave pulse towards the southeast (the rupture direction), where Sheikh was located. On the European macroseismic scale and Environmental Seismic Intensity scale, the mainshock was assigned a maximum intensity of X.

== Impact ==
One hundred and seventy-three villages were seriously damaged—106 in Bojnord County and 67 in Shirvan County. Damage was mainly attributed to the poor construction of adobe homes on steep slopes. One village in the meizoseismal area experienced the complete loss of all adobe-constructed homes; only two reinforced concrete buildings survived but with substantial damage. The villages of Naveh, Ghezel Ghan and Sheikh were completely destroyed. A total of 5,500 homes collapsed and 11,000 were damaged. An additional 12,000 livestock died. Many landslides and slope failures were reported. The total cost of damage was estimated to be greater than $US 30 million.

Residents were alerted to the possibility of a larger earthquake due to the occurrence of a M_{w} 5.4 foreshock at 13:23 IRST that same day. During the mainshock, many residents in the affected area were working outdoors. These factors prevented a higher death toll. Some damage was reported at Bojnurd—although no buildings collapsed, many were severely cracked and structurally compromised. A petrochemical plant located 15 km (9.3 mi) from the epicenter had minor damage, causing a cessation of operations for several days.

Initial reports stated that 38 people were killed and 90 were injured in the city of Bojnord alone, according to the Iranian state media. The following day, the death toll in Bojnurd and Shirvan rose to 72, and about 200 were injured. By 20 April, the death toll stood at 82 in Bojnord County and 6 in Shirvan County. At least 498 people were seriously injured and required hospitalization. A further 1,450 received minor injuries.

== Aftermath ==
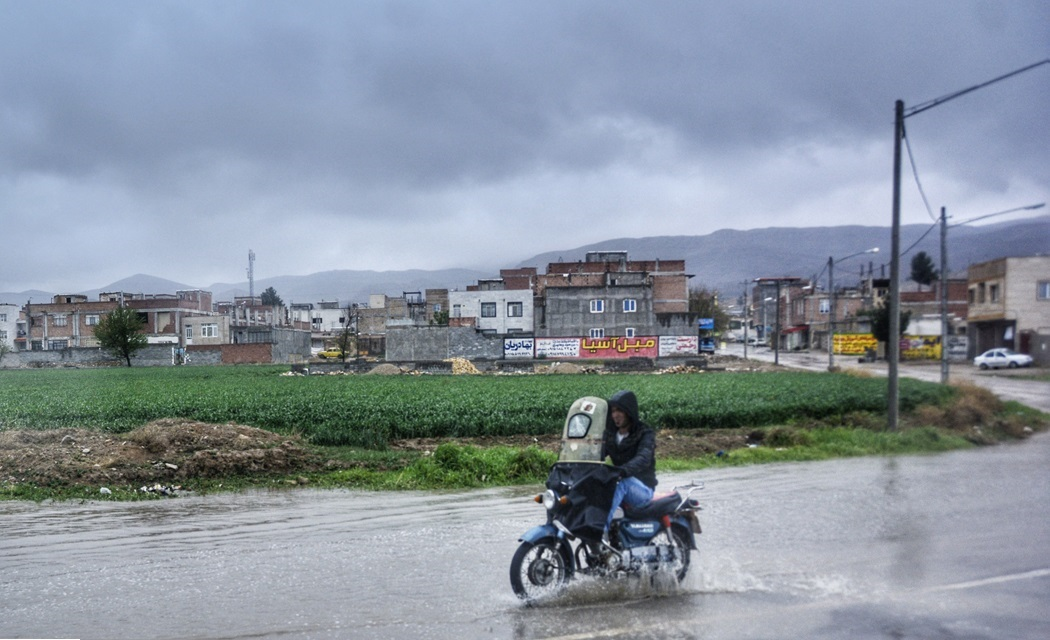
Bojnurd photographed in 2018

The Iranian Ministry of Interior helped organize aid and emergency work. Relief workers from multiple agencies, including the state government, Islamic Republic of Iran Armed Forces, and Red Crescent Society of Iran, were involved in providing aid to the affected communities. Items such as tents, lanterns, clothing, food and sanitary products were mobilized. The Government of Iran also stated international assistance would be welcomed and handled domestically.

Rumors about the potential for another large earthquake began to spread, causing panic. Mohammad Tartar, vice president of research and technology at Iran's International Institute of Earthquake Engineering and Seismology, said further studies were required to understand the geophysical effects on nearby faults introduced by the earthquake. He added there was a possibility that another fault might rupture and cause an earthquake in the next few years. However, the chances of a larger earthquake measuring 6.5 immediately following the 4 February event were slim. He also said strong aftershocks were possible and humanitarian agencies should be wary.

== See also ==
- Ardabil earthquake and Qayen earthquake – two other earthquakes affecting Iran in 1997
- List of earthquakes in 1997
- List of earthquakes in Iran

== Sources ==
- Robert, Alexandra M.M.; Letouzey, Jean; Kavoosi, Mohammad A.; Sherkati, Sharham; Müller, Carla; Vergés, Jaume; Aghababaei, Abdollah (2014). "Structural evolution of the Kopeh Dagh fold-and-thrust belt (NE Iran) and interactions with the South Caspian Sea Basin and Amu Darya Basin". Marine and Petroleum Geology. 57. Elsevier: 68–87. Bibcode:2014MarPG..57...68R. doi:10.1016/j.marpetgeo.2014.05.002. hdl:10261/98374.
- Jackson, James; Priestley, Keith; Allen, Mark; Berberian, Manuel (2002). "Active tectonics of the South Caspian Basin". Geophysical Journal International. 148 (2): 214–245. doi:10.1046/j.1365-246X.2002.01588.x.
- Hollingsworth, James; Jackson, James; Walker, Richard; Gheitanchi, Mohammad Reza; Bolourchi, Mohammad Javad (2006). "Strike-slip faulting, rotation, and along-strike elongation in the Kopeh Dagh mountains, NE Iran". Geophysical Journal International. 166 (3): 1161–1177. Bibcode:2006GeoJI.166.1161H. doi:10.1111/j.1365-246X.2006.02983.x. S2CID 130128137.
- Hollingsworth, James; Jackson, James; Alarcón, John E.; Bommer, Julian (2007). "The 4th February 1997 Bojnurd (Garmkhan) Earthquake in NE Iran: Field, Teleseismic, and Strong-Motion Evidence for Rupture Directivity Effects on a Strike-Slip Fault". Journal of Earthquake Engineering. 11 (2): 193–214. Bibcode:2007JEaEn..11..193H. doi:10.1080/13632460601031078. S2CID 128401211.
- Aminipanah, M.; Gheitanchi, M. R.; Ghorashi, M. (2010). "Source Parameters of the February 1997 Garmkhan Earthquake (North-East Bojnourd), Northeast Iran". Scientific Quarterly Journal of Geosciences. 20 (77): 193–214. doi:10.22071/GSJ.2010.55373.
- Amini, H.; Zare, M.; Gasperini, P. (2017). "Re-assessing the intensity values of Iranian earthquakes using EMS and ESI scales". Arabian Journal of Geosciences. 10 (22): 504. Bibcode:2017ArJG...10..504A. doi:10.1007/s12517-017-3226-3. S2CID 135158593.
- Berberian, Manuel (25 June 2014). "Chapter 9 – Active Tectonics and Geologic Setting of the Iranian Plateau". Developments in Earth Surface Processes. 17: 151–171. doi:10.1016/B978-0-444-63292-0.00009-0. ISBN 978-0-444-63292-0.
