= 1997 Manyi earthquake =

November 1997 earthquake in Tibet, PR China

- Location within Tibet
- UTC time: 1997-11-08 10:02:53
- ISC event: 1051405
- USGS-ANSS: ComCat
- Local date: November 8, 1997
- Local time: 18:02:53 CST
- Magnitude: 7.4 M_{w}
- Depth: 15 km (9.3 mi)
- Epicenter: 35.069°N 87.325°E
- Type: Strike-slip
- Areas affected: Tibetan Autonomous Region
- Max. intensity: MMI VII (Very strong)

The 1997 Manyi earthquake (Chinese: 玛尼地震) occurred on November 8 at 10:02 UTC. The epicenter was in Nagqu Prefecture in northern Tibet, China. The focal mechanism indicates a left-lateral strike-slip movement. This earthquake had a surface rupture of 17 km (11 mi) long with up to 7 m (23 ft) of left-lateral slip along the Manyi fault, a westward continuation of the Kunlun fault, offset about 100 km (62 mi) to the south. Normally, the continental crust is about 35 km (22 mi) thick, but it reaches 70 km (43 mi) thick under the Tibetan Plateau. This earthquake ruptured up to 20 km (12 mi) of the top part of the local continental crust.

== See also ==
- List of earthquakes in 1997
- List of earthquakes in China
