= 1871–72 Quchan earthquakes =

Earthquakes in Iran

- Location within Iran
- Local date: 23 December 1871
- 6 January 1872
- Magnitude: M_{w} 7.1, 7.0
- Epicenter: 37.4°N 58.4°E
- Areas affected: Razavi Khorasan province, Iran
- Casualties: ~6,000 fatalities

The 1871–72 Quchan earthquakes which affected present-day Razavi Khorasan province occurred less than a month apart. The first earthquake, measuring M_{w} 7.1, occurred on 23 December 1871, was followed by a M_{w} 7.0 earthquake in the same area on 6 January 1872. Altogether, these earthquakes killed at least 6,000 people in the Quchan area.

== Tectonic setting ==
Present-day seismic activity in Iran indicate tectonic deformation is being accommodated along the Zagros, Alborz and Kopet Dag mountains. Deformation is also accommodated in eastern and central Iran, as well as in the Dasht-e Lut, in the form of tectonic blocks. The Arabian shield moves northwards at approximately 23 mm (0.91 in) per year, where the Zagros fold and thrust belt accommodates roughly half of it. Meanwhile, the rest is distributed across the Alborz, Kopet Dag and central Caspian Sea. In southern Iran, this motion is partially accommodated by the Makran Trench subduction zone. In eastern Iran (south of the Kopet Dag), north–south trending right-lateral strike-slip faults in a 400 km (250 mi)-wide shear zone accommodate the motion.

== Earthquake ==
The northern Kopet Dag range front marks a linear boundary with the Turan platform (part of the Eurasian Plate). The Kopet Dag mountains consist of Mesozoic to Tertiary sedimentary rocks, and represent the closure of the Tethys Ocean, which closed when northeastern Iran was sutured to the tectonically stable Turan platform. The north–east convergence in northeastern Iran occurs obliquely with respect to the northwest–southeast trending Kopet Dag. Oblique convergence is accommodated by thrust faulting, and strike-slip faulting along a shear zone termed the Central Kopet Dag Shear Zone within the range. The northwestern Kopet Dag accommodates convergence with thrusting and minor left-lateral faulting. In the eastern Kopet Dag, north of Bojnurd, right-lateral strike-slip faulting occurs. Right-lateral faults have been observed displacing the mountain belt.

The north–south trending meizoseismal zone corresponded with a north-northwest–south-southeast trending dextral fault in the area. It runs through the Kopeh Dagh at an oblique angle and offsets the region's bedrock; continuing northwards, the fault joins with the Ashkabad Fault System. There is little evidence of faulting in the Atrak Valley to the south via satellite imaging, however, the damage pattern suggest the fault continues southwards. A river channel running along the projected path of the fault may be evidence of the fault's presence. The moment magnitude of the December 1871 earthquake was estimated at M_{w} 7.1.

== Impact ==
The 1871 earthquake resulted in 2,000 fatalities and another 4,000 people died in the 1872 shock. Both earthquakes destroyed at least half of the town; the dome at the Imamzadeh of Sultan Ibrahim was heavily damaged and declared a loss. One brick school building also collapsed. Damage was distributed across a north-northwest–south-southeast zone from near Esfejir to Quchan. In Esfejīr, 80 homes were levelled and eight settlements were devastated; 70 people were killed in Jafarabad and a fort in Khabushan was in ruins. Some nearby settlements to Quchan, such as Chalata, Hai Hai and Yusef Khan were unscathed. Weak shaking was felt in Shirvan, and the earthquake was also felt in Tehran and Marshad.

== See also ==
- List of earthquakes in Iran
- List of historical earthquakes
