= Tambo de Oro =

- Location within Coquimbo Region Location within Chile
- Location: Punitaqui, Coquimbo Region, Chile; 30°51′33.96″S 71°13′43.46″W
- Products: Gold
- Company: HMC Gold

The Tambo de Oro is an underground gold mine located in Coquimbo Region in north-central Chile. More precisely it lies near the Pacific in the commune of Punitaqui in the mining district of Punitaqui. The mine is operated by HMC Gold, a subsidiary of Haldeman Mining. In December 2021 the mine obtained permission from the Environmental Assessment Service to extend its operations for seven more years. In addition, the mine was allowed in increase its monthly average production from 15,000 to 15,317 metric tons. The mine has been required to install private security system after it was declared a "strategic enterprize" by the Ministry of the Interior in November 2023. Haldeman Mining has disputed this designation in courts.

In September 2020 two miners died as result of a rockfall in the mine.

The mine produces gold ore concentrate from ores in the form of veins and breccias of Early Cretaceous age. The ores have characteristics that are both epithermal and mesothermal.
