= 1997 Qayen earthquake =

Earthquake in Iran

- UTC time: 1997-05-10 07:57:29
- ISC event: 1026215
- USGS-ANSS: ComCat
- Local date: May 10, 1997
- Local time: 12:57
- Magnitude: 7.3 M_{w}
- Depth: 10 km (6 mi)
- Epicenter: 33.844°N 59.810°E
- Type: Strike-slip
- Areas affected: Iran; Afghanistan
- Total damage: US$100 million
- Max. intensity: MMI X (Extreme)
- Casualties: At least 1,567 dead, 2,300 injured, and around 50,000 homeless

An earthquake struck northern Iran's Khorasan Province in the vicinity of Qaen on May 10, 1997, at 07:57 UTC (12:57 local time). The largest in the area since 1990, the earthquake registered 7.3 on the moment magnitude scale and was centered approximately 270 kilometers (170 mi) south of Mashhad on the village of Ardekul. The third earthquake that year to cause severe damage, it devastated the Birjand–Qayen region, killing 1,567 and injuring more than 2,300. The earthquake—which left 50,000 homeless and damaged or destroyed over 15,000 homes—was described as the deadliest of 1997 by the United States Geological Survey. Some 155 aftershocks caused further destruction and drove away survivors. The earthquake was later discovered to have been caused by a rupture along a fault that runs underneath the Iran–Afghanistan border.

Damage was eventually estimated at $100 million, and many countries responded to the emergency with donations of blankets, tents, clothing, and food. Rescue teams were also dispatched to assist local volunteers in finding survivors trapped under the debris. The destruction around the earthquake's epicenter was, in places, almost total; this has been attributed to poor construction practices in rural areas, and imparted momentum to a growing movement for changes in building codes for earthquake-safe buildings. With 1 in 3,000 deaths in Iran attributable to earthquakes, a US geophysicist has suggested that a country-wide rebuilding program would be needed to address the ongoing public safety concerns.

== Background and geology ==
Iran experiences regular earthquakes, with 200 reported in 1996 alone. Like dozens that had preceded it, the 1997 Qayen event was of significant magnitude. It occurred on Saturday, May 10, 1997, at 12:57 IRST in the Sistan region, one of the most seismically active areas of the country. The first major earthquake in that region since 1979, it registered 7.3 on the moment magnitude scale (M_{w}), 7.2 on the surface-wave magnitude scale (M_{s}), 7.7 on the energy magnitude scale (M_{e}), and had a maximum perceived intensity of X (Extreme) on the Mercalli intensity scale.

The earthquake was caused by a rupture along the Abiz Fault, part of the Sistan suture zone of eastern Iran. Located northeast of the main collision zone between the Arabian and Eurasian tectonic plates, the Sistan zone marks the eastern boundary of the Iranian microplate where it intersects with the Afghan crustal block. Most of Iran is contained on one microplate, causing seismic activity mainly along its borders. Both the 1968 Dasht-e-Bayez earthquake (magnitude 7.3, resulting in 12,000–20,000 deaths) and the Qayen earthquake were the results of strike-slip faults, meaning that the crustal blocks on either side of the faults shifted against each other horizontally. The Qayen earthquake was caused by right lateral movement along the Abiz Fault. In addition to the dominant strike-slip displacement, there was also local evidence of reverse faulting. The average displacement of about 2 m indicates a low static stress drop, more consistent with an interplate earthquake than an intraplate event. The maximum horizontal acceleration during the quake was approximately 6.9 meters per second—nearly three-quarters of the acceleration an object would have in free fall—and occurred near the earthquake's epicenter. The crustal layer involved in the rupture was 20–25 kilometers (12–16 mi) thick. The ground rupture for the earthquake extended for 110 kilometers (68 mi), which was longer than would be expected given the earthquake's magnitude. There were at least 155 aftershocks, reaching a magnitude of up to 5.5 on the Richter magnitude scale. Many of the aftershocks occurred along the rupture up to 24 kilometers (15 mi) below the surface.

The earthquake's epicenter was within the village of Ardekul in South Khorasan Province, which borders Afghanistan. The village is isolated between mountains and hills. Although the Iranian government had distributed more than 800 seismographs throughout the country, few had been placed in the Qayen region due to its desert climate and the remoteness of the area.

As a result of the dry climate, timber—a main component in building earthquake-resistant homes—is scarce in Qayen; homes are instead constructed of adobe. The inhabitants of the poverty-stricken region rely on subsistence farming, raising livestock and crops such as wheat and saffron. When the earthquake struck, much of the population was already working in the fields; for the most part, these people survived. Many of those treated for injuries were found to be undernourished.

== Damage and casualties ==
The earthquake was felt over an area of 500,000 square kilometers (193,051 mi^{2}), including in the cities of Mashhad, Kerman and Yazd. Destruction was most severe within a 100-kilometer (60 mi) strip between the epicenter and Birjand. The tremors triggered landslides across the region and proved highly destructive to the region's mud-hut buildings. Entire streets were reduced to rubble, and in one village, 110 young girls were killed when their elementary school collapsed.

An initial report in The New York Times claimed that more than 2,000 people had died in the worst-affected area, with a further 394 in Birjand and two in the small town of Khavaf. The earthquake was also said to have caused five fatalities in Afghanistan. As rescue efforts proceeded these figures were revised; the United States Geological Survey states that 1,572 (Note: 1,567 deaths in Iran and a further five in the Herat area of Afghanistan.) people were killed and as many as 2,300 injured. As bodies were retrieved, they were buried in mass graves. Officials worried that a temperature fluctuation—from 5 to 29 °C (41 to 84 °F) on the day of the earthquake—would cause the corpses to rot more quickly, spreading infection.

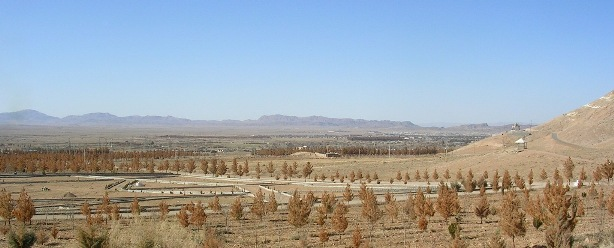
Southwest view of Qayen in 2006

Many villages lost both power and water, leaving survivors unable to fend for themselves. The injured were often up to 140 kilometers (90 mi) away from the nearest hospital. One doctor, highlighting the desperate need for physicians to treat the injured, said "I don't know how many casts I have done today, but it seems like hundreds." The extensive aftershocks prompted survivors to leave the vicinity of their homes and take to tents. Several days later, another earthquake of magnitude 4.8 struck. In the wake of the earthquake and its aftershocks, every one of the 700 houses in the tiny village of Abiz, 90 kilometers (56 mi) east of Qayen, was destroyed, and 400 of its 1,200 residents killed.

According to an Iranian radio station report, 200 villages sustained severe damage or were totally destroyed. The United States Geological Survey estimated that 10,533 houses were destroyed; an additional 5,474 homes sustained varying degrees of damage. Fifty thousand people were left homeless. Local officials initially estimated the cost of the damage at $67 million 1997 US$ (roughly 89.5 million 2008 USD). The estimate was later raised to 100 million 1997 USD (roughly 133.6 million 2008 USD). One hundred schools and many health centers in the stricken areas were discovered to be in need of repair work.

Many of the more seriously damaged homes were of simple construction, with walls made of mud, adobe, or brick packed 40–50 cm (16–20 in) thick. These materials are generally more vulnerable to the force of the earthquake, but some of the traditionally constructed homes sustained little or no damage. This was due to a range of factors, possibly including the height-to-width ratio, the lack of windows, and the quality of the materials used. In general, reinforced concrete-framed homes, built after the 1979 earthquake, were better able to withstand the earthquake. Those near the epicenter still sustained severe damage due to the weight of the roofs and the weak joint connections between major structural elements of the buildings.

== Relief efforts ==
Organization/country	Amount donated
United Nations-related agencies	$525,000
Japan	$300,000
OPEC countries	$300,000
Germany	$235,000
United Kingdom	$200,000
Norway	$90,000
Denmark	$35,000
International Red Cross and Red Crescent Organizations	$33,800
United States	$25,000

Several thousand volunteers were brought in to join the search for survivors buried under mounds of brick and cement debris. Many volunteers used their hands. Local organizations, including the Iranian Red Crescent, sent 9,000 tents, more than 18,000 blankets, canned food, rice, and dates. An additional 80 short tons (73 t) of supplies were sent by the Iranian government to Mashhad, from where the relief efforts were being coordinated.

The United Nations Secretary-General, Kofi Annan, pleaded that the international community "respond promptly and with generosity". France dispatched a cargo plane filled with blankets, tents, clothing, and food, while Swiss authorities sent a rescue team with dogs trained in search-and-rescue. Several aircraft carrying tents, blankets, and kerosene stoves from European and Arab countries arrived in Mashad on May 14. Representatives from the United States, calling the disaster a "humanitarian issue", said that despite their strong differences with Iran they would donate supplies and other aid if requested. The Mennonite Central Committee, an American relief agency stationed in Akron, Pennsylvania, redirected to the relief effort 400 metric tons (440 short tons) of lentils and cooking oils intended for immigrant refugees. A specialist British disaster rescue organisation, the International Rescue Corps, offered to send a team but were refused visas (with the reasoning that "enough rescue crews had already arrived at the disaster site"), and a Swiss offer of additional assistance was also turned down. Several countries within the Persian Gulf political region sent condolences to the families of victims and the government in the area.

Because the affected area is extremely remote, distributing the relief supplies was difficult. Reaching some villages would require a five-hour drive over unpaved roads, some of which had collapsed or had been covered by landslides during the earthquake. Helicopters were used to provide supplies to some otherwise inaccessible areas.

Although aid operations continued for some time, the Iranian government ceased rescue work on May 14. No more survivors were expected to be found in the rubble.

== Future threats ==
Iran was listed as "the worst offender" in a 2004 report on countries with poor earthquake engineering. Professor Roger Bilham of the University of Colorado at Boulder, a geophysicist who specializes in earthquake-related deformation and hazards, blames construction practices for the fact that since the start of the 20th century, 1 in 3,000 Iranians has died in an earthquake-related incident. Bilham argues that "Most of Iran needs rebuilding." The United Nations have prepared a Common Country Assessment for Iran, which likewise states that "While adequate building regulations exist for large cities, it is generally believed that they are not rigorously adhered to... most of those who have suffered in recent major earthquakes have lived in small towns and villages. Earthquake-proof construction is very rare in those areas and adequate building regulations are not yet in place". An analysis of the performance of traditional buildings during the earthquake concluded that several factors, including high construction costs, poor materials, a shortage of skills in rural areas, and a lack of building regulations governing traditional construction techniques, have led to a deterioration in the quality of such buildings. The study recommended regulations to govern the construction of traditional arches and domes.

The earthquakes of Iran are a large concern to the populace and are an impediment to economic development. Twelve earthquakes with a Richter magnitude of over seven have occurred within the last century. Three-quarters of the major cities of Iran are in areas prone to major earthquakes. The 1990 Manjil–Rudbar earthquake, with at least 42,000 fatalities, cost Iran roughly 7.2 percent of its Gross National Product (GNP) for that year and wiped out two years of economic growth.

In 2007, the Asian Centre on Seismic Risk Reduction was formed in response to the regular earthquakes experienced by the southern, southwestern, and central Asian areas. This organization exists to "encourage regional and inter-regional networking and partnerships to reduce seismic damage". Earthquakes account for 73 percent of natural disaster deaths in the area.

== See also ==
- List of earthquakes in 1997
- List of earthquakes in Iran
- List of earthquakes in Afghanistan
- Bojnurd earthquake and Ardabil earthquake – two other earthquakes affecting Iran in 1997
