= Yopurga County =

Yopurga County يوپۇرغا ناھىيىسى (Uyghur) 岳普湖县 (Chinese) Yopurgha, Yuepuhu, Yupogha, Yüeh-p'u-hu
- County
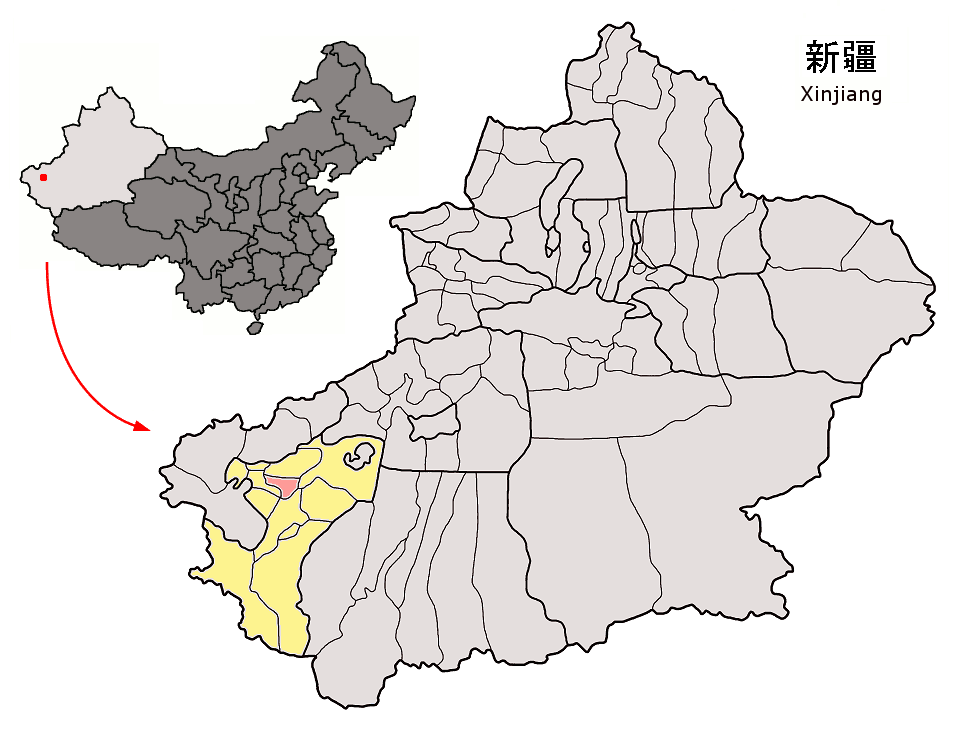
- Location of the county in Kashgar Prefecture (yellow) and Xinjiang

- Location of the county in Xinjiang Yopurga (Xinjiang) Yopurga (China)
- Coordinates: 39°13′51″N 76°44′25″E
- Country: China
- Autonomous region: Xinjiang
- Prefecture: Kashgar
- County seat: Yopurga
- Township-level divisions: 4 towns, 5 townships

Area
  - Total: 3,128.09 km^{2} (1,207.76 sq mi)

Population (2020)
  - Total: 162,675
  - Density: 52.0046/km^{2} (134.691/sq mi)

Ethnic groups
  - Major ethnic groups: Uyghur
- Time zone: UTC+8 (China Standard (Note: Locals in Xinjiang frequently observe UTC+6 (Xinjiang Time), 2 hours behind Beijing.))
- Postal code: 844400
- Website: yph.gov.cn (in Chinese)

Yopurga County

Uyghur name
- Uyghur: يوپۇرغا ناھىيىسى
Transcriptions
- Latin Yëziqi: Yopurgha Nahiyisi
- Yengi Yeziⱪ: Yopurƣa naⱨiyisi
- SASM/GNC: Yopurga
- Siril Yëziqi: Йопурға наһийиси

Chinese name
- Simplified Chinese: 岳普湖县
- Traditional Chinese: 岳普湖縣
Transcriptions
Standard Mandarin
- Hanyu Pinyin: Yuèpǔhú Xiàn
- Wade–Giles: Yüeh^{4}-p'u^{3}-hu^{2} Hsien^{4}

Yopurga County (Uyghur: يوپۇرغا ناھىيىسى) is a county in northern Kashgar Prefecture, Xinjiang Uyghur Autonomous Region. More than 96% of the residents of the county are Uyghurs and live around oases at the western edge of the desolate Taklamakan Desert. The county is bordered to the north by Jiashi County, to the east by Maralbexi County, to the west by Shule County, to the southwest by Yengisar County and to the south by Yarkant County.

== Name ==
Yopurga County is named for the Yopurga River.

== History ==
In the Qing Dynasty, the area was part of Shule as Yopurga Zhuang (岳普尔湖庄).

In 1940, Yopurga Shezhiju (岳普湖設治局) was created from portions of Shule County, Yengisar County, and Jiashi County. In 1943, Yopurga was made a county.

On October 20, 2014, Terim (Tieremu) Township became Terim Town.

On July 24, 2015, Yekshenbebazar (Yekexian Baibazha) was changed from a township to a town.

== Geography ==
Dawakol (Dawakun) National Desert Park (达瓦昆沙漠旅游风景区) is located in Yopurga County.

Yopurga County is situated in the western Tarim Basin, at the lower reaches of the Gaizi River, on a desert-oasis alluvial plain. It has a typical warm temperate continental arid climate, with an average annual precipitation of 52.8 mm and annual evaporation of 2,584 mm. Soil salinization affects nearly 90% of the county's arable land.

== Climate ==
Climate data for Yopurga, elevation 1,206 m (3,957 ft), (1991–2020 normals, extremes 1981–2010)
Month	Jan	Feb	Mar	Apr	May	Jun	Jul	Aug	Sep	Oct	Nov	Dec	Year
Record high °C (°F)	21.0 (69.8)	19.9 (67.8)	30.8 (87.4)	35.5 (95.9)	37.3 (99.1)	39.1 (102.4)	41.0 (105.8)	41.5 (106.7)	35.7 (96.3)	30.6 (87.1)	26.3 (79.3)	19.5 (67.1)	41.5 (106.7)
Mean daily maximum °C (°F)	0.8 (33.4)	7.1 (44.8)	16.5 (61.7)	24.5 (76.1)	28.6 (83.5)	32.2 (90.0)	33.7 (92.7)	32.4 (90.3)	28.2 (82.8)	21.6 (70.9)	12.2 (54.0)	2.9 (37.2)	20.1 (68.1)
Daily mean °C (°F)	−5.7 (21.7)	0.3 (32.5)	9.2 (48.6)	16.6 (61.9)	20.7 (69.3)	24.2 (75.6)	25.6 (78.1)	24.2 (75.6)	19.7 (67.5)	12.4 (54.3)	3.8 (38.8)	−3.6 (25.5)	12.3 (54.1)
Mean daily minimum °C (°F)	−11.3 (11.7)	−5.8 (21.6)	2.3 (36.1)	9.1 (48.4)	13.4 (56.1)	16.8 (62.2)	18.4 (65.1)	17.3 (63.1)	12.7 (54.9)	5.2 (41.4)	−2.6 (27.3)	−8.7 (16.3)	5.6 (42.0)
Record low °C (°F)	−25.3 (−13.5)	−25.9 (−14.6)	−9.2 (15.4)	−2.1 (28.2)	2.5 (36.5)	6.4 (43.5)	10.2 (50.4)	9.3 (48.7)	2.7 (36.9)	−4.8 (23.4)	−15.0 (5.0)	−23.2 (−9.8)	−25.9 (−14.6)
Average precipitation mm (inches)	2.1 (0.08)	3.2 (0.13)	4.3 (0.17)	4.2 (0.17)	12.6 (0.50)	11.0 (0.43)	14.9 (0.59)	12.2 (0.48)	7.5 (0.30)	3.6 (0.14)	2.0 (0.08)	1.6 (0.06)	79.2 (3.13)
Average precipitation days (≥ 0.1 mm)	2.1	1.7	1.3	1.5	3.5	4.2	5.3	4.4	2.9	1.0	0.5	1.5	29.9
Average snowy days	5.8	3.0	0.6	0.1	0	0	0	0	0	0	0.6	4.6	14.7
Average relative humidity (%)	66	56	43	35	40	41	47	52	54	56	59	69	52
Mean monthly sunshine hours	150.3	158.3	191.0	222.8	278.5	320.8	324.2	295.7	264.6	255.4	200.6	151.7	2,813.9
Percentage possible sunshine	49	51	51	55	62	72	72	71	72	75	68	52	63
Source: China Meteorological Administration

== Administrative divisions ==
Yopurga County included 4 towns and 5 townships:

Name	Simplified Chinese	Hanyu Pinyin	Uyghur (UEY)	Uyghur Latin (ULY)	Administrative division code	Notes
Towns
Yopurga Town	岳普湖镇	Yuèpǔhú Zhèn	يوپۇرغا بازىرى	yopurgha baziri	653128100	
Eshme Town	艾西曼镇 (艾西买镇)	Àixīmàn Zhèn (Àixīmǎi Zhèn)	ئەشمە بازىرى	Eshme baziri	653128101	
Terim Town	铁热木镇	Tiěrèmù Zhèn	تېرىم بازىرى	tërim baziri	653128102	Formerly Terim Township (تېرىم بازىرى / 铁热木乡)
Yekshenbebazar Town	也克先拜巴扎镇	Yěkèxiānbàibāzhā Zhèn	يەكشەنبەبازار بازىرى	yekshenbebazar baziri	653128103	formerly Yekshenbebazar Township (يەكشەنبەبازار بازىرى / 也克先拜巴扎乡)
Townships
Yopurga Township	岳普湖乡	Yuèpǔhú Xiāng	يوپۇرغا يېزىسى	yopurgha yëzisi	653128200	
Aqqik Township	阿其克乡	Āqíkè Xiāng	ئاچچىق يېزىسى	Achchiq yëzisi	653128203	
Siyek Township	色也克乡	Sèyěkè Xiāng	سىيەك يېزىسى	siyek yëzisi	653128204	
Bayawat Township	巴依阿瓦提乡	Bāyī'āwǎtí Xiāng	بايئاۋات يېزىسى	bay'awat yëzisi	653128206	
Axunluqum Township	阿洪鲁库木乡	Āhónglǔkùmù Xiāng	ئاخۇنلۇقۇم يېزىسى	Axunluqum yëzisi	653128207	

== Economy ==
Agricultural products include wheat, cotton, corn, muskmelon, and oilseed products. Beekeeping is relatively developed. Herding is important, primarily sheep herding. Industries include cotton and hemp processing, food and oil processing, and concrete.

Farmers in the county raise donkeys for meat, milk and donkey-hide gelatin.

In July 1953, Yopurga County was reported to have 87,000 mou of winter and spring wheat.

== Demographics ==
Historical population
Year	Pop.	±% p.a.
2000	129,441	—
2010	147,688	+1.33%

In 1997, Uyghurs made up 94.6% of the county's population.

According to the 2002 census, it has a population of 130,000.

As of 2015, the population of Yopurga County was 96.1% Uyghur and 3.9% Han Chinese. As of 2015, 167,860 of the 177,955 residents of the county were Uyghur, 9,801 were Han Chinese and 294 were from other ethnic groups.

As of 1999, 94.68% of the population of Yopurga (Yuepuhu) County was Uyghur and 5.28% of the population was Han Chinese.

== Historical maps ==
Historical English-language maps including modern-day Yopurga County area:

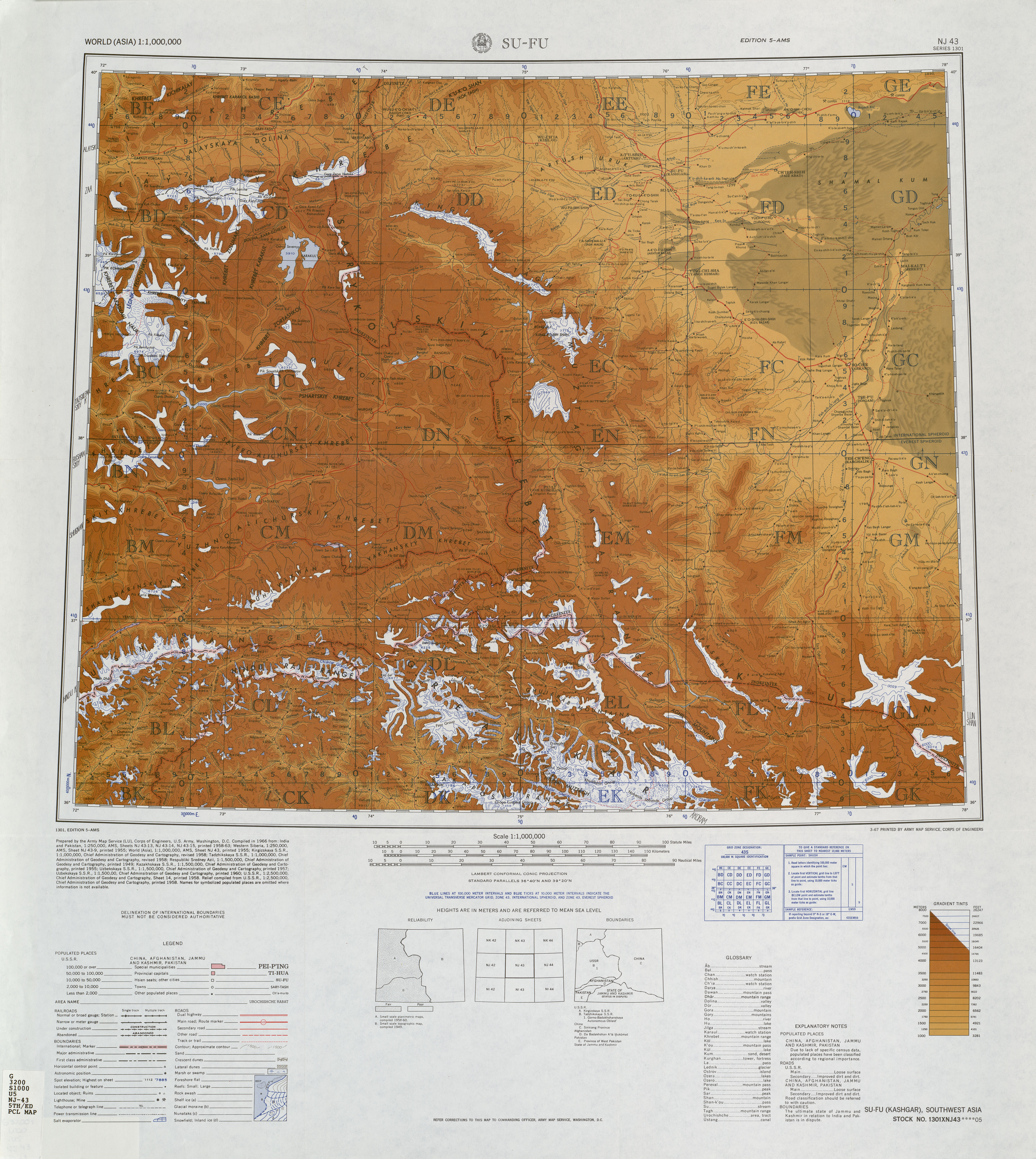
Map including Yopurga (labeled as YÜEH-P'U-HU (YUPOGHA)) and surrounding region from the International Map of the World (AMS, 1966)

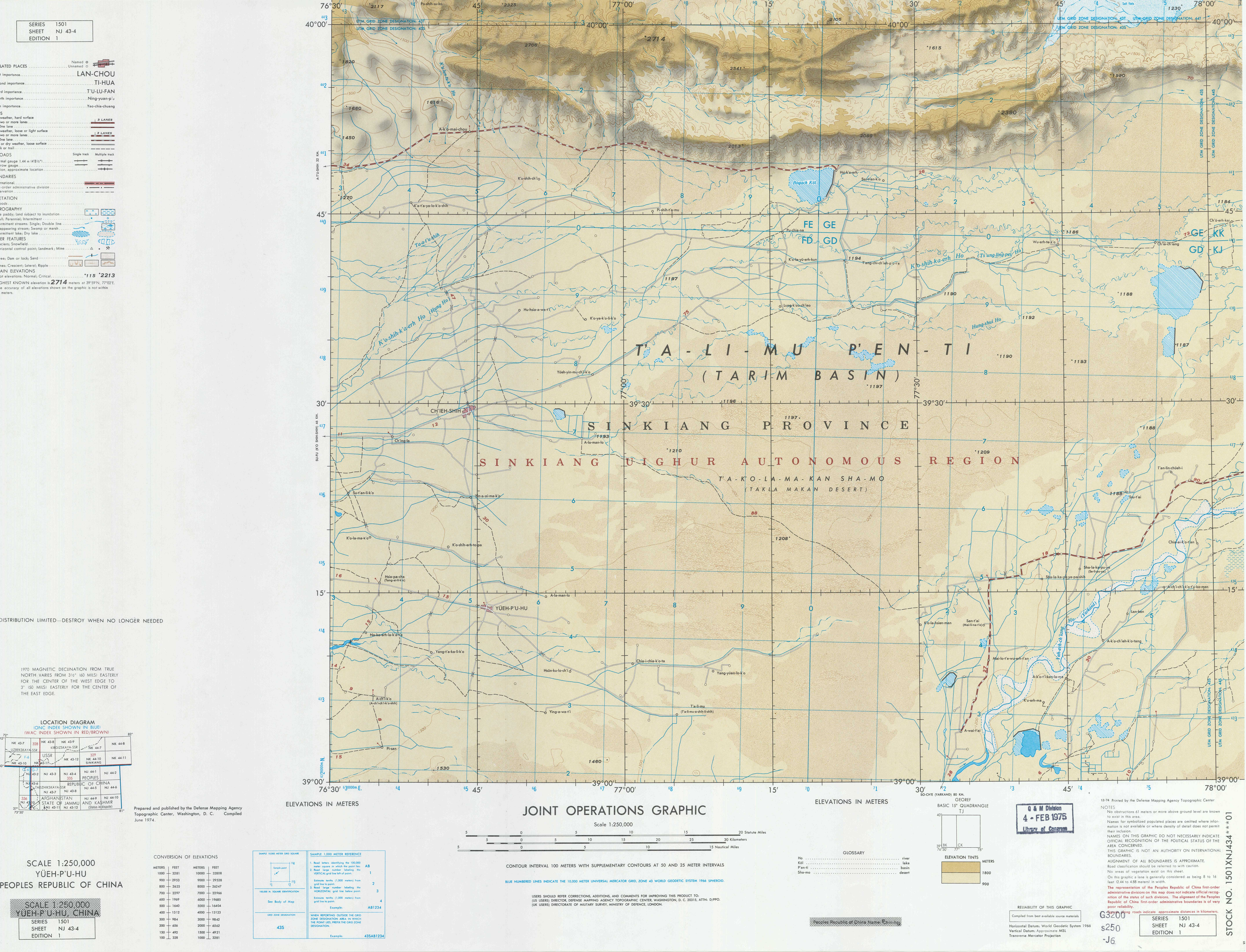
Map including Yopurga (labeled as YÜEH-P'U-HU) (DMA, 1974)

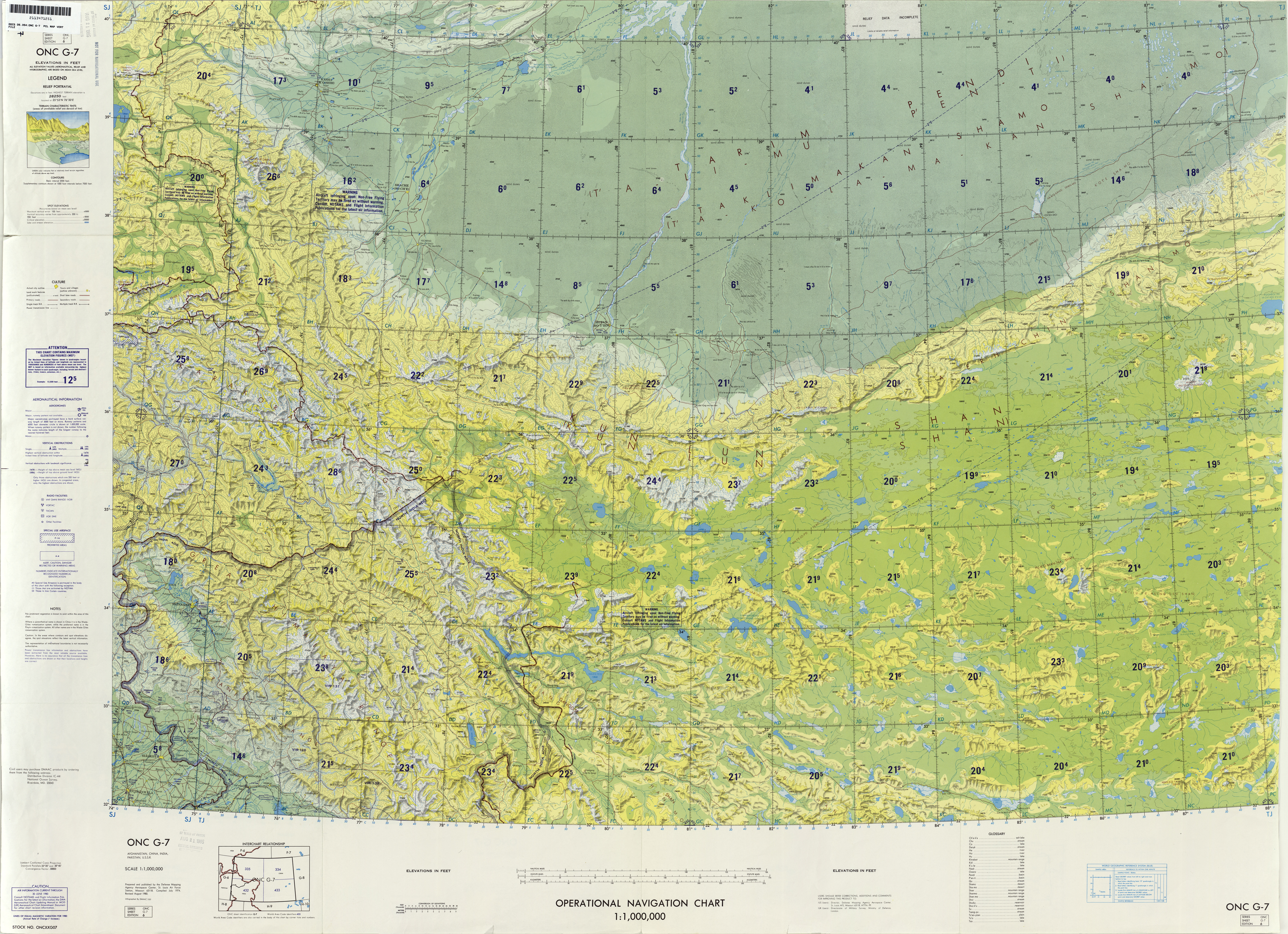
From the Operational Navigation Chart; map including Yopurga (Yüeh-p'u-hu) (DMA, 1980) (Note: From map: "The representation of international boundaries is not necessarily authoritative.")

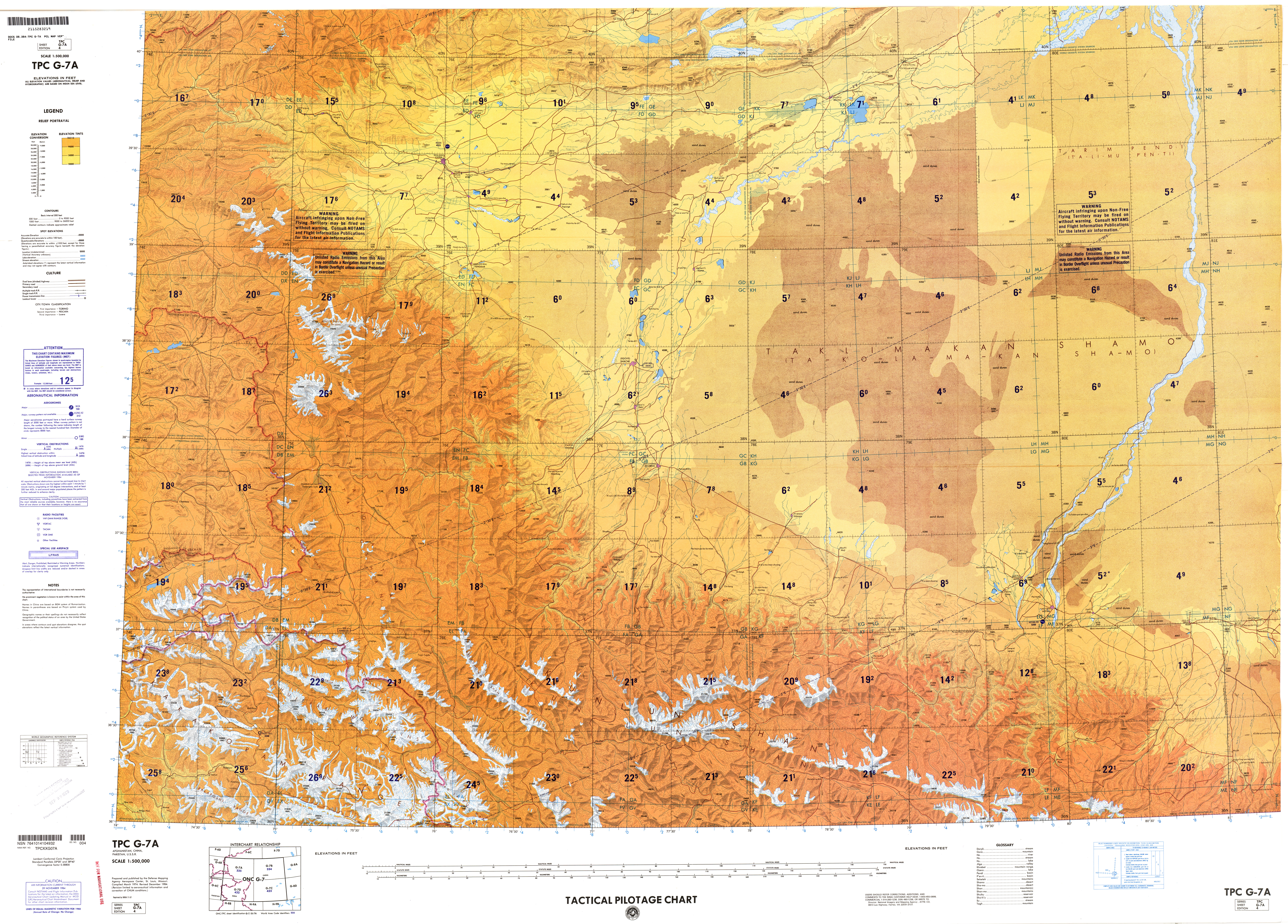
Map including Yopurga (Yüeh-p'u-hu) (DMA, 1984) (Note: From map: "The representation of international boundaries is not necessarily authoritative")
