= 1997 Jabalpur earthquake =

Earthquake in India

- Location within Madhya Pradesh Location within India
- UTC time: 1997-05-21 22:51:28
- ISC event: 1028286
- USGS-ANSS: ComCat
- Local date: May 22, 1997
- Local time: 04:21
- Magnitude: 5.8 M_{w}
- Depth: 38.7 km (24 mi)
- Epicenter: 23.1°N 80.14°E
- Type: Dip-slip
- Areas affected: India
- Total damage: $37–143 million
- Max. intensity: MMI VIII (Severe)
- Casualties: 38–56 dead 1,000–1,500 injured 30,000 displaced

The 1997 Jabalpur earthquake occurred on May 22, at 04:21:31 AM in Jabalpur District in the Indian state of Madhya Pradesh. The epicenter of the earthquake was located near Koshamghat village. According to geologist Dr V. Subramanyan, former professor at the Indian Institute of Technology Bombay (IIT Bombay), the earthquake was caused by movement on the Narmada Fault.

== Damage and casualties ==
Major damage occurred to structures in the Jabalpur District, Mandla District, Seoni District and Chhindwara District in Madhya Pradesh. Jabalpur and Mandla were the worst affected districts. A total of 887 villages were affected. Approximately 8,546 houses collapsed and nearly 52,690 houses were partially damaged. Some aftershock activity occurred, but they did not cause any additional damage. Longitudinal ground cracks were observed in some locations of the affected area.

The affected region consisted of both rural and urban areas and the campus of the Jawaharlal Nehru Agricultural University was the worst affected structure in the urban area. Diagonal cracks occurred in walls, buildings were partially collapsed and the hostel for postgraduate students was severely damaged. Approximately 1,500 houses owned by the Indian Railways were damaged. In Jabalpur, a 500,000 gallon-capacity shaft-supported water tank for storage and distribution of drinking water sustained both horizontal cracking and diagonal cracking. Some earthen dams located in the districts of Jabalpur and Mandla reportedly developed longitudinal cracks.

== Relief efforts ==
The search and rescue operation after the earthquake was relatively small. Only raw materials for food were supplied to the victims rather than cooked food because of the summer heat. The Indian Army was called in to aid. Many people were given cloth tents as temporary shelters. In rural areas persons whose houses had collapsed were provided with 18 wooden posts and 50 wooden purlins for reconstruction and cash assistance of 3,000 rupees. MPs belonging to the Bharatiya Janata Party (BJP) decided to donate their one day's salary to the victims.

== See also ==
- List of earthquakes in 1997
- List of earthquakes in India
- Earthquake zones of India
