= 1997 Punitaqui earthquake =

Earthquake in Chile

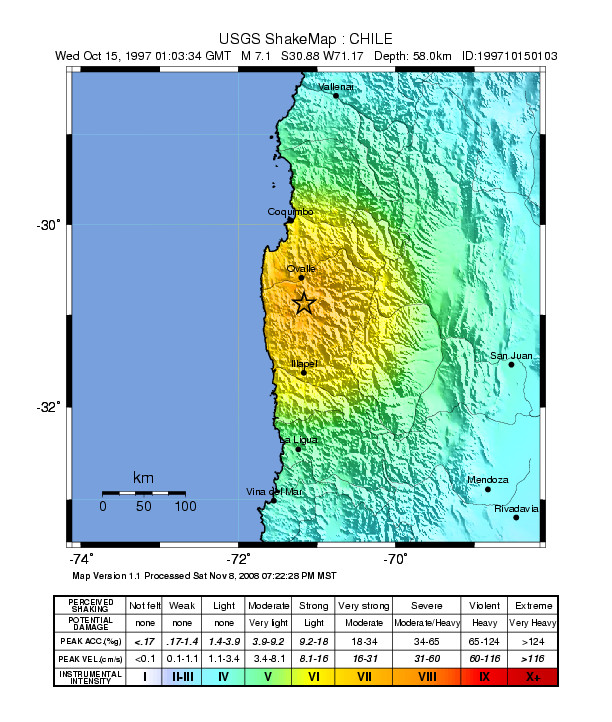
- UTC time: 1997-10-15 01:03:33
- ISC event: 1047434
- USGS-ANSS: ComCat
- Local date: October 14, 1997
- Local time: 22:03
- Magnitude: 7.1 M_{wc}
- Depth: 58 km (36 mi)
- Epicenter: 30.93°S 71.22°W
- Areas affected: Chile
- Max. intensity: MMI VII (Very strong)
- Casualties: 8 dead, 300+ injured

The 1997 Punitaqui earthquake occurred at 01:03 UTC on October 15. It had an estimated magnitude of 7.1 M_{wc}. This earthquake was one of the most destructive in the epicentral area compared to other events of subduction of the same size. The extensive damage to structures was the result of an amplification effect on the ground and the poor quality of building materials. This reflects the potential for damage in an intraplate earthquake with vertical fault and how it can be much greater than what an interplate earthquake can cause; this caused severe damage in Chilean cities of La Serena, Vicuña, Ovalle, Illapel and Punitaqui.

== Tectonic setting ==
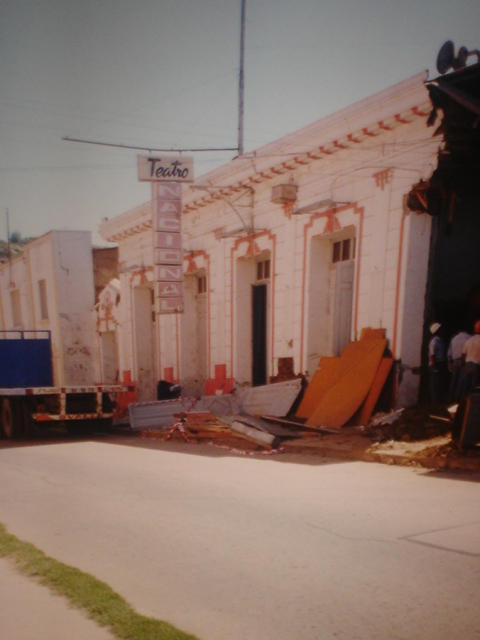
Ovalle National Theatre after the earthquake.

Chile lies above the convergent plate boundary where the Nazca plate is subducting beneath the South American plate, at a location where they converge at a rate of seventy millimeters a year. This quake was an oceanic interplate type, occurred in the downgoing slab of the Nazca plate and not on the interface between the two plates. This event took place under the area of Chile, between 27° and 33° S, where the slab is nearly horizontal and there is a high degree of mechanical coupling between the plates.

The October earthquake occurred in the area of the plate interface that ruptured during the 1943 Ovalle earthquake, which had a magnitude of 7.9–8.3 M_{w}. Other major earthquakes have occurred in the same area like the Valparaíso earthquake of August 1730, of 9.2 M_{w} and the 1880 Illapel earthquake which registered a magnitude of 8.8 M_{w}. This entire segment is delimited by the rupture zones of 1965 and 1971 in Aconcagua and 1906 in Valparaíso to the south, while to the north by the 1922 rupture in the Atacama Region.

== Damage ==
Punitaqui was practically demolished by the quake, where the Mercalli intensity was VII. Damage ranged from as far north as the Antofagasta Region to the southern Araucanía Region.

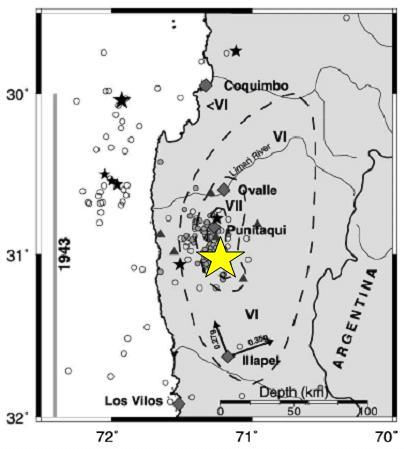
Location of the earthquake and aftershocks.

In Santiago, the quake felt undulating because of the distance from the epicenter. Both Santiago and Valparaíso regions lost telephone service and radio transmission. In La Serena, hysteria broke out, and people went into the streets as a precaution. The quake left 8 people dead, over 300 injured and 10,913 homeless, concentrating most of those in the provinces of Elqui and Limarí.

== See also ==
- List of earthquakes in 1997
- List of earthquakes in Chile
