= Shaptul =

Shaptul شاپتۇل بازىرى 夏普吐勒镇 Xaptul; Xiaputule
- Town
- Location in Xinjiang Shaptul (China)
- Coordinates: 39°28′06″N 076°37′04″E
- Country: China
- Autonomous Region: Xinjiang
- Prefecture: Kashgar
- County: Payzawat/Jiashi

Area
  - Total: 236 km^{2} (91 sq mi)

Population (2010)
  - Total: 28,944

Ethnic groups
  - Major ethnic groups: Uyghur
- Time zone: UTC+8 (China Standard)

Shaptul also been written as Xiabutuoqu, Xiaputule and Xaptul. is a town in Payzawat County, Kashgar Prefecture, Xinjiang, China.

== History ==
1958, Shaptul was part of Gaochao Commune.1964, Xiafutao Commune was created from part of Gaochao Commune.1966, the commune was renamed Dongfeng Commune.1984, the commune was made into Shaptul Township. 2014, Shaptul Township was disestablished and Shaptul Town was created.

== Administrative divisions ==
Shaptul includes twenty-four villages (PRC Hanyu Pinyin-derived names, except where Uyghur is provided):

- Yang'airike, Kamatierike, Zhahongla, Jiayi'airike (Jiayi Airikecun; 39°28′56″N 076°38′17″E, Tuowanjiayi'airike, Dun'aireke, Arexiaputule, Timu (Timucun; 39°32′02″N 076°40′50″E, Milike (Milikecun; 39°31′29″N 076°39′30″E, Yikensu (Yikensucun; ) 39°30′34″N 076°30′49″E, Keman, Langan, Bayi'airike, Qazanköl ( / Kazankuli, Anjiang'airike, Qina'airike, Tuoshikanla (Tuoshi Kanlacun;39°27′40″N 076°35′54″E, Bayituokayi, Qiayila, Qiong'a'airike, Keqike'a'airike, Kumudun, Bazha, Hongqi

== See also ==
- List of township-level divisions of Xinjiang
