= Annifo =

- Frazione
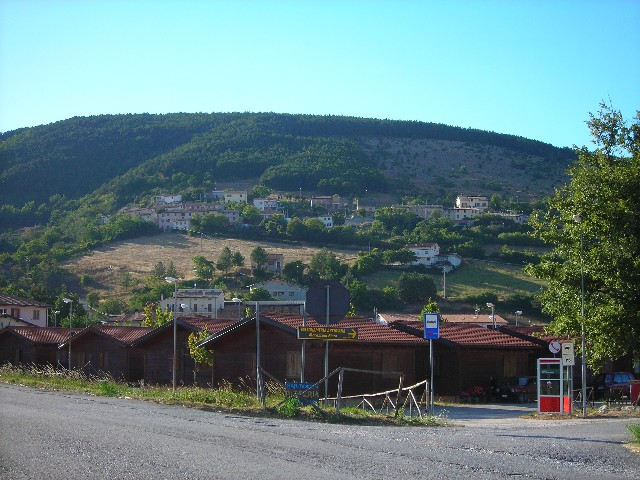

- Location within Italy
- Coordinates: 43°03′15″N 12°51′27″E
- Country: Italy
- Region: Umbria
- Province: Perugia
- Comune: Foligno
- Elevation: 874 m (2,867 ft)

Population (2001)
  - Total: 244
- Time zone: UTC+1 (CET)
  - Summer (DST): UTC+2 (CEST)
- Postcode: 06034
- Area code: 0742
- Website: www.annifo.org

Annifo is a frazione of the comune of Foligno, Umbria, central Italy. It is located at 874 m. According to the Istat census of 2001, it has 244 inhabitants.
