= 1997 Jiashi earthquakes =

Earthquakes in China

- Location within China
- UTC time: ??
- Local date: 21 January – 16 April 1997
- Magnitude: 5.9 M_{w}
- Depth: 11 kilometres (7 mi)
- Epicenter: 39.47°N 76.99°E
- Areas affected: China
- Casualties: 12 killed, 40 injured

The Jiashi earthquakes were a series of earthquakes from 1997 to 2003, with several earthquakes larger than M_{s} 6 occurring between January and April 1997. Two strong earthquakes with magnitudes M_{s} 6.4 and 6.3 occurred on January 21, 1997, at 09:47 and 09:48 local time, respectively, in Jiashi County of Xinjiang Autonomous Region, NW China. The earthquakes occurred on a major strike-slip fault beneath the Tarim Basin. The fault has no surface expression and prior to the earthquake was unknown. At least 12 people were killed and 40 injured in the earthquakes of January 21. Another earthquake on March 1, 1997, at 14:04 local time with magnitude M_{s} 6.0 killed another person. On April 6, 11 and 16, other four earthquakes with magnitudes M_{s} 6.3, 6.4, 6.6 and 6.3 killed 8 people. Several predictions were made in this earthquake series. Some of the predictions were not fulfilled, while some preceded the predicted earthquake from 2.5 hours to 4 days. The April 11 earthquake occurred 30 minutes after a prediction was made. Rebiya Kadeer wrote that her career was significantly affected by the earthquakes, which were "one of the worst natural disasters that had occurred in the Uyghur nation in recent memory." One hundred villages and one thousand homes were leveled. Kadeer organized donations and aid for the area.

== See also ==
- List of earthquakes in China
