= Payzawat County =

Payzawat County پەيزاۋات ناھىيىسى (Uyghur) 伽师县 (Chinese) Jiashi, Ch'ieh-shih, Faiz Abad
- County
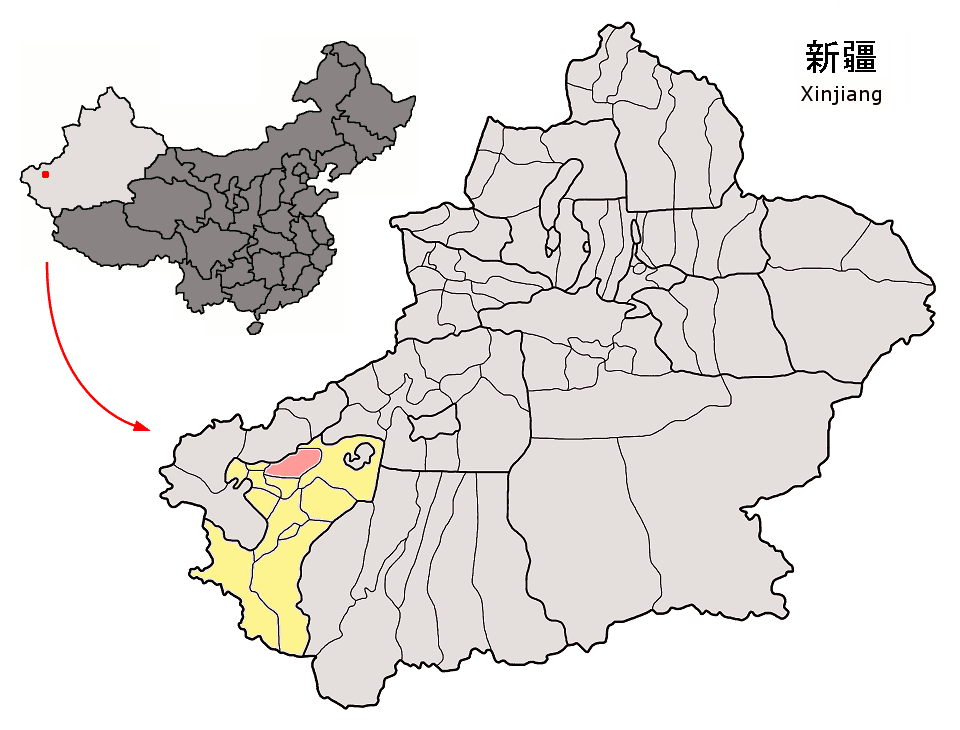
- Location of Peyziwat County (red) and Kashgar Prefecture (yellow) within Xinjiang

- Location of the seat in Xinjiang Peyziwat (Xinjiang) Peyziwat (China)
- Coordinates: 39°29′18″N 76°42′45″E
- Country: China
- Autonomous region: Xinjiang
- Prefecture: Kashgar
- County seat: Barin

Area
  - Total: 6,600.68 km^{2} (2,548.54 sq mi)

Population (2020)
  - Total: 424,821
  - Density: 64.3602/km^{2} (166.692/sq mi)

Ethnic groups
  - Major ethnic groups: Uyghur
- Time zone: UTC+8 (China Standard (Note: Locals in Xinjiang frequently observe UTC+6 (Xinjiang Time), 2 hours behind Beijing.))
- Postal code: 844300
- Website: www.xjjsx.gov.cn (in Chinese)

Payzawat County

Uyghur name
- Uyghur: پەيزاۋات ناھىيىسى
Transcriptions
- Latin Yëziqi: Peyzavat Nahiyisi
- Yengi Yeziⱪ: Pəyzavat Naⱨiyisi
- SASM/GNC: Payziwat Nahiyisi
- Siril Yëziqi: Пәйзават Наһийиси

Chinese name
- Simplified Chinese: 伽师县
- Traditional Chinese: 伽師縣
Transcriptions
Standard Mandarin
- Hanyu Pinyin: Jiāshī Xiàn
- Wade–Giles: Chia¹-shih¹ Hsien⁴

Alternative Chinese name
- Simplified Chinese: 排孜阿瓦提县
- Traditional Chinese: 排孜阿瓦提縣
Transcriptions
Standard Mandarin
- Hanyu Pinyin: Páizī'āwǎtí Xiàn

Kazakh name
- Kazakh: ءپايزاۋات اۋدانى; Пәйзауат ауданы Päizauat audany

Payzawat County, (also romanized as Payziwat County, from Uyghur: پەيزاۋات ناھىيىسى; Chinese: 排孜阿瓦提县), also known as Jiashi County (Chinese: 伽师县), is a county in Kashgar Prefecture, Xinjiang Uyghur Autonomous Region, China, on the western rim of the Taklamakan Desert. To the east, the county borders Maralbexi County, to the south Yopurga County.

== Name ==
The name "Jiashi" was first used in Chinese documents of Tang Dynasty and was adopted when Emperor Guangxu established the county in 1902. Allegedly the word is a transliteration of a celestial Turkic word for jade and has the same origin to "Kashi", Mandarin transliteration for "Kashgar". The Uyghur name "Payziwat" means "God's blessing of fortune" and was sometimes used in documents in Qing Dynasty. Payzawat means 'beautiful land of plenty'.

The name of the region is also transliterated as Faizabad.

== History ==
Peyziwat County was established in July 1902.

In 1981, there was a brief pro-independence rebellion, the Jiashi uprising (1981年伽师县"5·27"暴乱), in the county staged by Uyghur activists after riots in Kashgar.

The 1997 Jiashi earthquakes, continuing to 2003, were a series of deadly earthquakes in the county. Rebiya Kadeer wrote that her career was significantly affected by the earthquakes, which were "one of the worst natural disasters that had occurred in the Uyghur nation in recent memory." One hundred villages and one thousand homes were leveled. Kadeer organized donations and aid for the area. In February 2002, a 6.7 magnitude earthquake killed 267 people in Maralbexi County and Payzawat County.

On 27 August 2008, two ethnic Uyghur police officers were killed.

On 20 October 2014, Shaptul (Xiaputule) was changed from a township to a town.

In 2017, Jiashi County Secondary Vocational School (伽师县中等职业学校), one of the Xinjiang re-education camps, was increased in size, adding new dormitories and factory warehouses; significant security features were added through the introduction of secure 'military-style management'.

On the night of 19 January 2020, a strong earthquake (2020年喀什地震) damaged buildings and seriously injured at least one person in the county.

== Administrative divisions ==
Payzawat County includes 6 towns, 7 townships, and one other area:

Name	Simplified Chinese	Hanyu Pinyin	Uyghur (UEY)	Uyghur Latin (ULY)	Administrative division code	Notes
Towns
Barin Town	巴仁镇	Bārén Zhèn	بارىن بازىرى	barin baziri	653129100	
Shekerkol Town	西克尔库勒镇	Xīkè'ěrkùlè Zhèn	شېكەركۆل بازىرى	shëkerköl baziri	653129101	
Shaptul Town	夏普吐勒镇	Xīkè'ěrkùlè Zhèn	شاپتۇل بازىرى	shaptul baziri	653129102	formerly Shaptul Township (شاپتۇل يېزىسى / 夏普吐勒乡)
Gholtoghraq Town	卧里托格拉克镇	Wòlǐtuōgélākè Zhèn	غولتوغراق بازىرى	gholtoghraq baziri	653129103	formerly Gholtoghraq Township (卧里托格拉克乡)
Qizilboyi Town	克孜勒博依镇	Kèzīlèbóyī Zhèn	قىزىلبويى بازىرى	qizilboyi baziri	653129104	formerly Qizilboyi Township (قىزىلبويى يېزىسى / 克孜勒博依乡)
Qoshawat Town	和夏阿瓦提镇	Kèzīlèbóyī Zhèn	قوشئاۋات بازىرى	qosh'awat baziri	653129107	formerly Qoshawat Township ( قوشئاۋات يېزىسى / 和夏阿瓦提乡)
Townships
Terim Township	铁日木乡	Tiěrìmù Xiāng	تېرىم يېزىسى	tërim yëzisi	653129200	
Yengimehelle Township	英买里乡	Yīngmǎilǐ Xiāng	يېڭىمەھەللە يېزىسى	yëngimehelle yëzisi	653129201	
Janbaz Township	江巴孜乡	Jiāngbāzī Xiāng	جانباز يېزىسى	janbaz yëzisi	653129202	
Misha Township	米夏乡	Mǐxià Xiāng	مىشا يېزىسى	misha yëzisi	653129205	
Kizilsu Township	克孜勒苏乡	Kèzīlèsū Xiāng	قىزىلسۇ يېزىسى	qizilsu yëzisi	653129208	
Gulluk Township	古勒鲁克乡	Gǔlèlǔkè Xiāng	گۈللۈك يېزىسى	güllük yëzisi	653129209	
Ordeklik Township	玉代克力克乡	Yùdàikèlìkè Xiāng	ئۆردەكلىك يېزىسى	Ördeklik yëzisi	653129210	

== Economy ==
The system of irrigation is well-developed. Agricultural products include wheat, corn, sorghum, cotton and muskmelon. Animal herding is also common, primarily sheep. Specialities of the county include the 'Payzawat melon' (伽师瓜) and white grapes without pits. Industries include tractors, electronics, leather making, construction, and cotton and melon processing.

As of 1885, there was about 55,400 acres (366,889 mu) of cultivated land in Payzawat.

== Demographics ==
Historical population
Year	Pop.	±% p.a.
2000	311,733	—
2010	381,767	+2.05%

As of 2015, 437,073 of the 445,846 residents of the county were Uyghur, 8,342 were Han Chinese, 431 were from other ethnic groups.

As of 2009, Uyghurs made up 98.9% of the county's population.

According to the 2002 census, it has a population of 320,000.

As of 1999, 96.46% of the population of Payzawat (Jiashi) County was Uyghur and 3.52% of the population was Han Chinese.

In 1997, Uyghurs made up 97.2% of the county's population.

== Climate ==
Climate data for Payzawat, elevation 1,205 m (3,953 ft), (1991–2020 normals, extremes 1981–present)
Month	Jan	Feb	Mar	Apr	May	Jun	Jul	Aug	Sep	Oct	Nov	Dec	Year
Record high °C (°F)	20.1 (68.2)	19.7 (67.5)	30.2 (86.4)	35.3 (95.5)	36.4 (97.5)	39.6 (103.3)	39.8 (103.6)	40.1 (104.2)	37.1 (98.8)	30.8 (87.4)	25.8 (78.4)	19.9 (67.8)	40.1 (104.2)
Mean daily maximum °C (°F)	0.7 (33.3)	6.9 (44.4)	16.2 (61.2)	24.3 (75.7)	28.6 (83.5)	32.1 (89.8)	33.7 (92.7)	32.3 (90.1)	28.1 (82.6)	21.4 (70.5)	12.0 (53.6)	2.7 (36.9)	19.9 (67.9)
Daily mean °C (°F)	−5.7 (21.7)	0.2 (32.4)	9.1 (48.4)	16.6 (61.9)	20.7 (69.3)	24.1 (75.4)	25.7 (78.3)	24.2 (75.6)	19.7 (67.5)	12.3 (54.1)	3.8 (38.8)	−3.6 (25.5)	12.3 (54.1)
Mean daily minimum °C (°F)	−10.9 (12.4)	−5.7 (21.7)	2.5 (36.5)	9.2 (48.6)	13.4 (56.1)	16.7 (62.1)	18.6 (65.5)	17.3 (63.1)	12.6 (54.7)	5.1 (41.2)	−2.3 (27.9)	−8.1 (17.4)	5.7 (42.3)
Record low °C (°F)	−24.8 (−12.6)	−25.5 (−13.9)	−7.7 (18.1)	−1.4 (29.5)	4.3 (39.7)	6.6 (43.9)	10.7 (51.3)	9.8 (49.6)	4.1 (39.4)	−3.9 (25.0)	−13.0 (8.6)	−21.6 (−6.9)	−25.5 (−13.9)
Average precipitation mm (inches)	2.6 (0.10)	3.8 (0.15)	5.1 (0.20)	4.0 (0.16)	12.5 (0.49)	11.5 (0.45)	11.1 (0.44)	15.0 (0.59)	9.1 (0.36)	3.1 (0.12)	1.9 (0.07)	2.0 (0.08)	81.7 (3.21)
Average precipitation days (≥ 0.1 mm)	2.6	1.8	1.5	1.6	3.7	4.6	4.6	5.1	2.9	1.1	0.7	2.0	32.2
Average snowy days	5.9	2.9	0.7	0	0	0	0	0	0	0	0.6	4.7	14.8
Average relative humidity (%)	66	56	44	37	41	43	47	54	57	59	61	70	53
Mean monthly sunshine hours	155.7	170.3	202.7	230.0	279.9	310.5	321.3	293.6	267.6	253.3	201.3	155.1	2,841.3
Percentage possible sunshine	51	55	54	57	62	70	72	70	73	75	68	53	63
Source: China Meteorological Administration all-time January highall-time September high

== Transportation ==
- G3012 Turpan–Hotan Expressway

== Historical maps ==
Historical English-language maps including Payzawat:

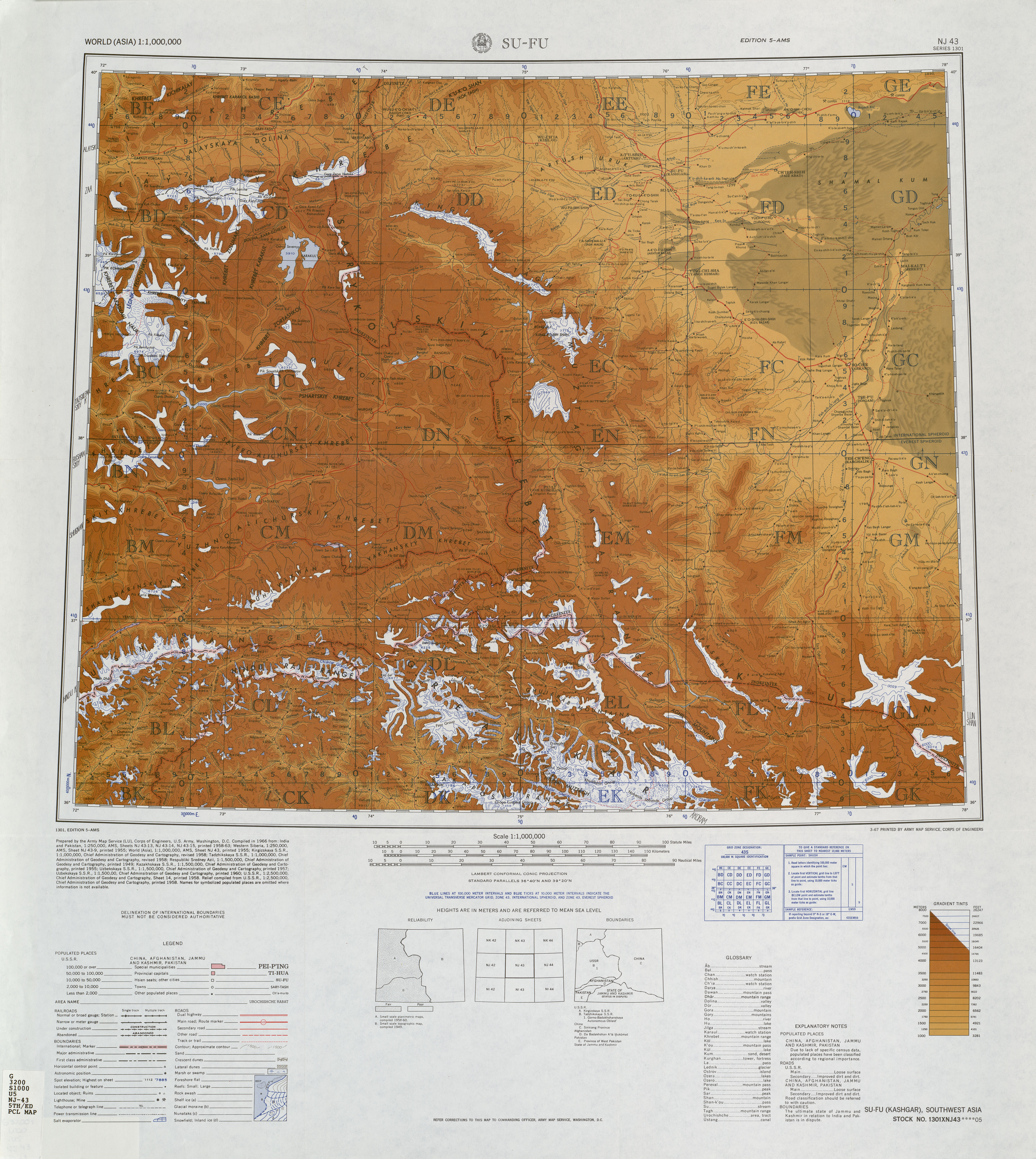
Map including Payzawat (labeled as CH'IEH-SHIH (FAIZ ABAD)) from the International Map of the World (AMS, 1966) (Note: From map: "DELINEATION OF INTERNATIONAL BOUNDARIES MUST NOT BE CONSIDERED AUTHORITATIVE")

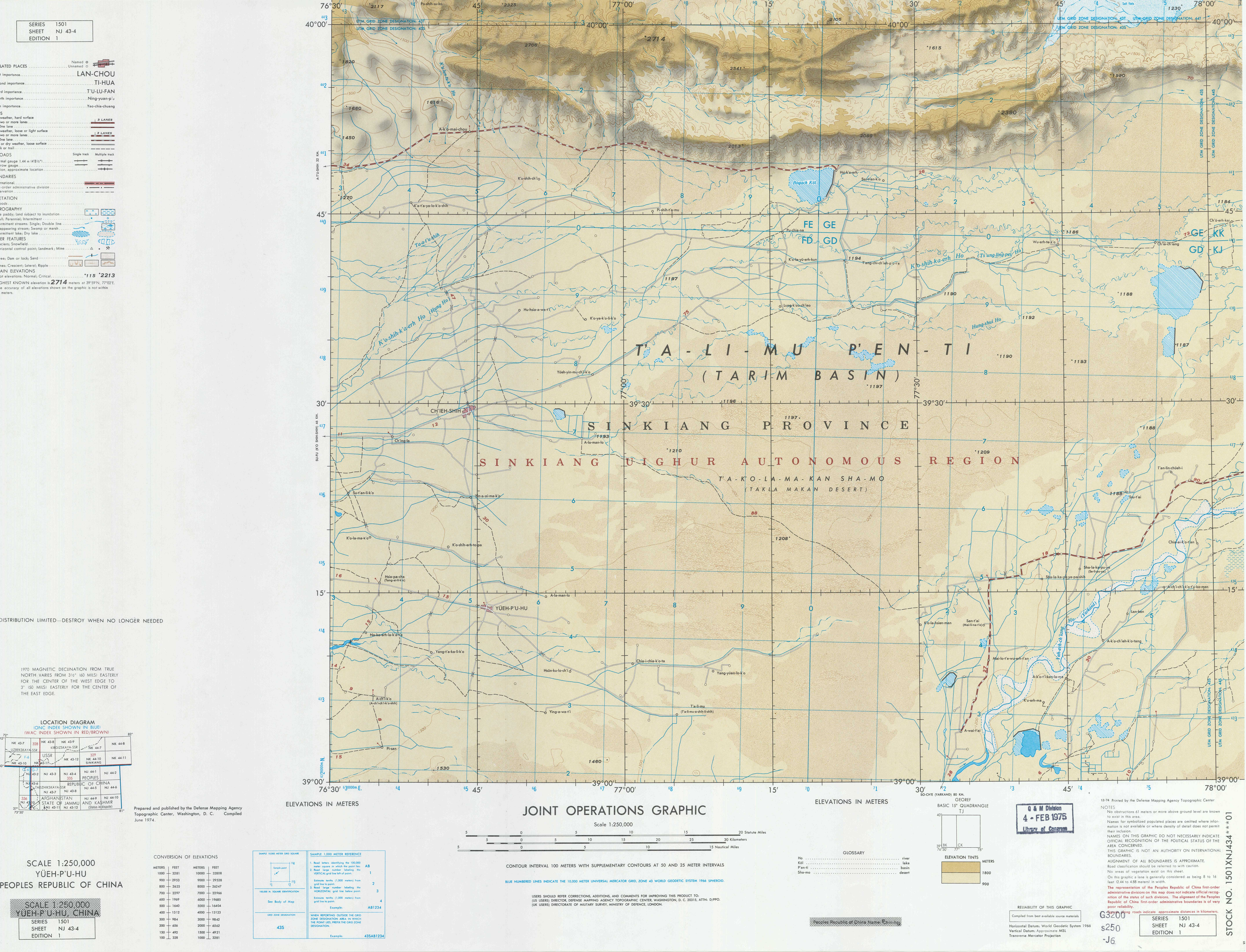
Map including Payzawat (labeled as CH'IEH-SHIH) (DMA, 1974)

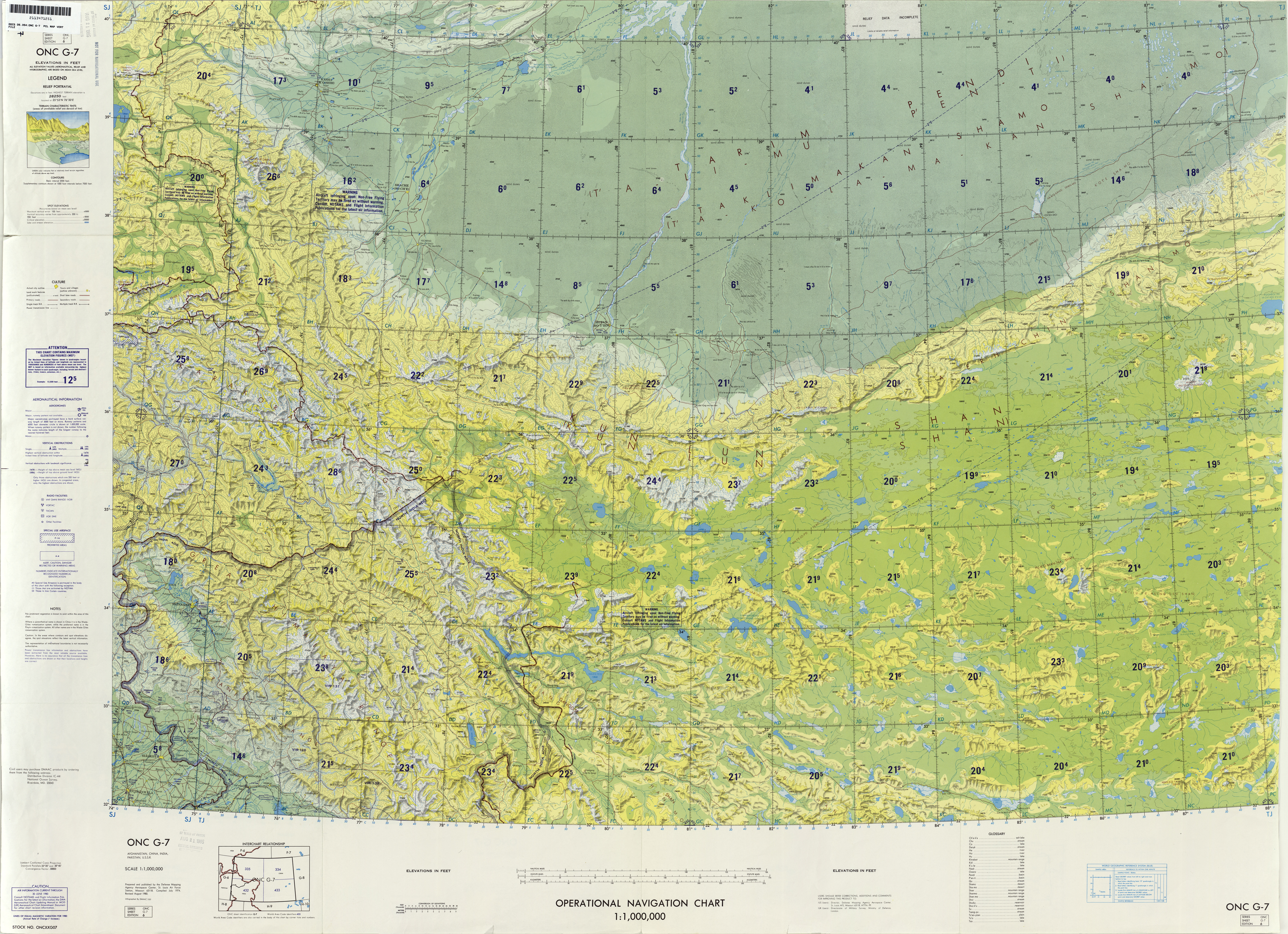
From the Operational Navigation Chart; map including Payzawat (labeled as Jiashi (Ch'ieh-shih)) (DMA, 1980) (Note: From map: "The representation of international boundaries is not necessarily authoritative.")

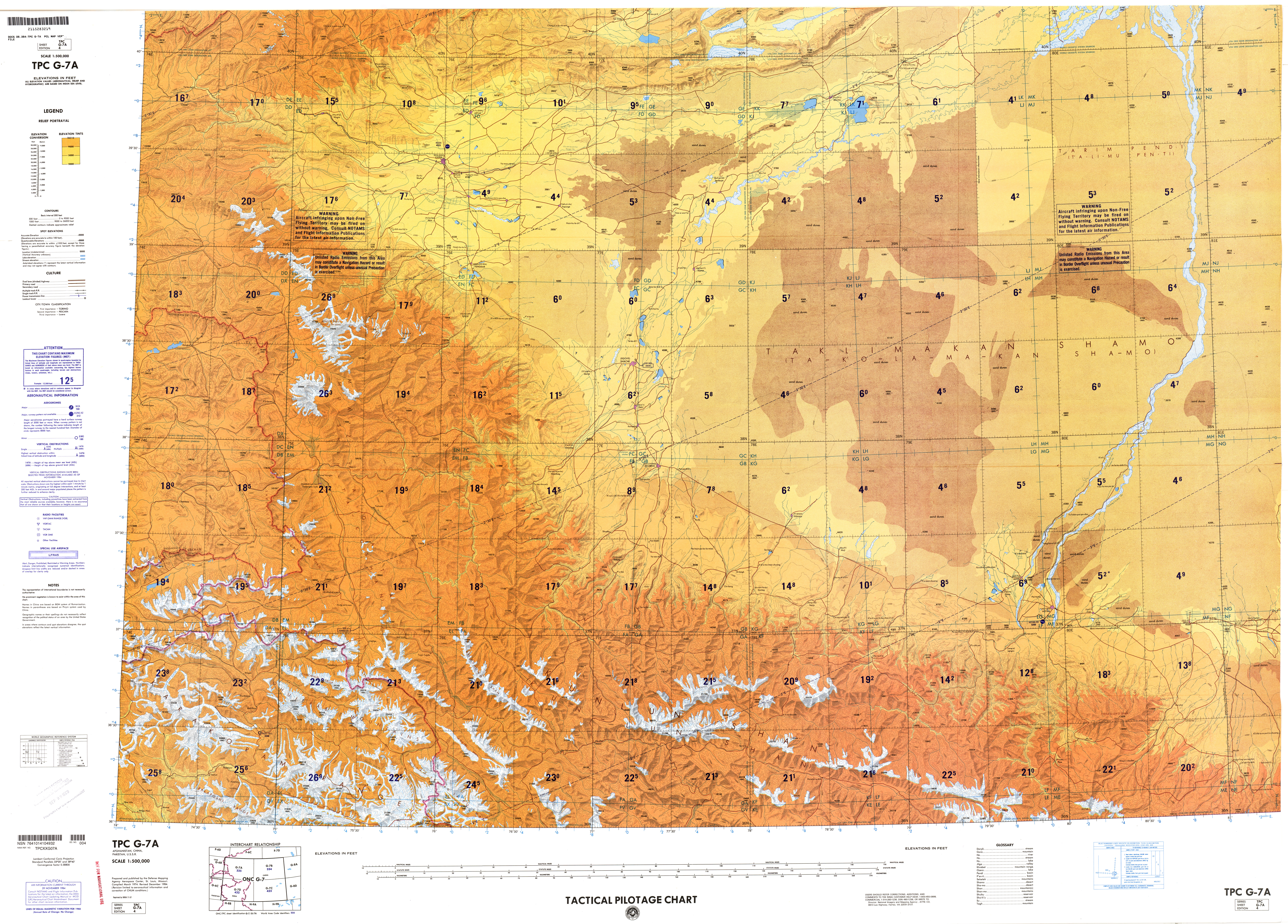
Map including Payzawat (labeled as Jiashi (Ch'ieh-shih)) (DMA, 1984) (Note: From map: "The representation of international boundaries is not necessarily authoritative")
