= Punitaqui =

- Town and Commune
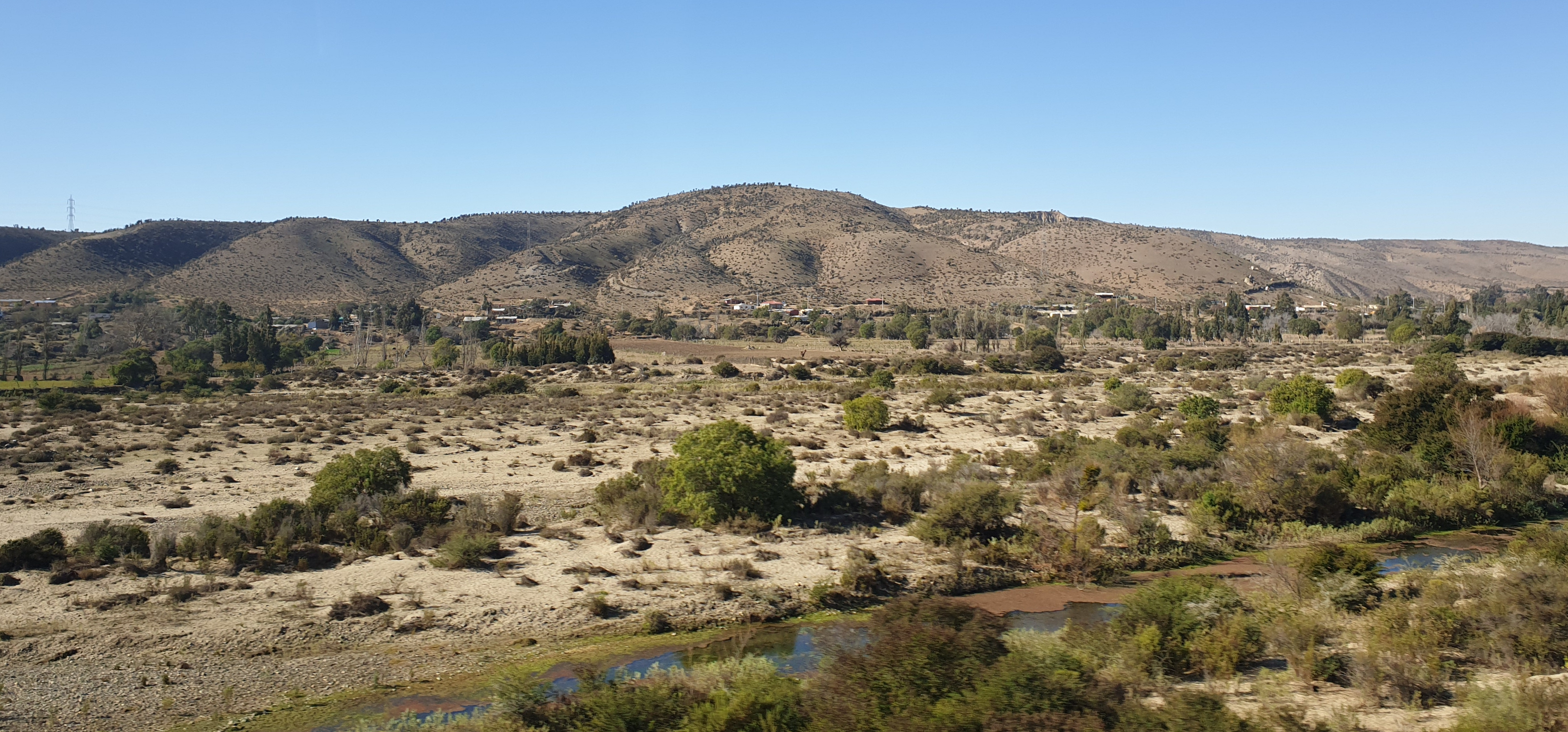

- Coat of arms Location in Chile
- Coordinates (city): 30°54′S 71°16′W
- Country: Chile
- Region: Coquimbo
- Province: Limarí
- Founded: 1785

Government
  - Type: Municipality
  - Alcalde: Carlos Araya Bugueño

Area
  - Total: 1,339.3 km^{2} (517.1 sq mi)
- Elevation: 450 m (1,480 ft)

Population (2012)
  - Total: 10,418
  - Density: 7.7787/km^{2} (20.147/sq mi)
  - Urban: 3,615
  - Rural: 5,924
- Demonym: Punitaquino

Sex
  - Men: 4,791
  - Women: 4,748
- Time zone: UTC-4 (CLT)
  - Summer (DST): UTC-3 (CLST)
- Postal code: 04304
- Area code: +(56) 5
- Website: Municipality of Punitaqui

Punitaqui is a town and commune of Chile in the Limarí Province. Punitaqui hosts an eponymous mining district which includes the gold mine of Tambo de Oro. There are ores of copper, gold and mercury around Punitaqui.

== History ==
Punitaqui was once part of the Ovalle Department before the administrative restructuring of 1976.

=== 1997 earthquake ===
On October 15, 1997 the town was nearly demolished by an estimated 7.1 M_{w} earthquake. Damage ranged from as far north as the Antofagasta Region to the southern Araucanía Region. Both Santiago and Valparaíso Region lost telephone service and radio transmissions. The quake left 8 people dead, 360 injured and 59,913 homeless, concentrating most of those in the provinces of Elqui and Limarí.

== Demographics ==
According to the 2002 census by the National Statistics Institute, the commune covers an area of 1,339.3 km^{2} (517 sq mi) with a population of 9,539 inhabitants (4,791 male and 4,748 female). The population grew 9.4% (816 persons) between 1992 and 2002. There are 3,615 inhabitants in urban areas and 5,924 in rural areas.

== Administration ==
As a commune, Punitaqui is a third-level administrative division of Chile administered by a municipal council, headed by an alcalde who is directly elected every four years. The 2016-2020 alcalde is Carlos Araya Bugueño.

Within the electoral divisions of Chile, Punitaqui is represented in the Chamber of Deputies by Mr. Miguel Alvarado (PDC) and Mr. Luis Lemus (Ind.) as part of the 9th electoral district, (together with Combarbalá, Monte Patria, Illapel, Salamanca, Los Vilos, Canela). The commune is represented in the Senate by Adriana Muños (PDC) and Jorge Pizarro Soto (PDC) as part of the 4th senatorial constituency (Coquimbo Region).
