= Chalaki, Razavi Khorasan =

Chalaki چالاکی
- Village
- Location within Iran
- Coordinates: 37°05′58″N 58°35′03″E
- Country: Iran
- Province: Razavi Khorasan
- County: Quchan
- Bakhsh: Central
- Rural District: Shirin Darreh

Population (2006)
  - Total: 163
- Time zone: UTC+3:30 (IRST)
  - Summer (DST): UTC+4:30 (IRDT)

Chalaki (Persian: چالاکی, also Romanized as Chālākī) is a village in Shirin Darreh Rural District, in the Central District of Quchan County, Razavi Khorasan Province, Iran. At the 2006 census, its population was 163, in 43 families.
