= Laraki (disambiguation) =

Laraki is a Moroccan sports car manufacturer.

Laraki may also refer to:

- Ahmed Laraki (born 1931), Prime Minister of Morocco 1969–1971
- Azzeddine Laraki (1929–2010), Prime Minister of Morocco 1986–1992
- The Kumzari language and people of Larak Island

== See also ==
- Al-Iraqi (disambiguation)
