= Larak =

Larak may refer to the following:

- Larak (Sumer), a city in ancient Sumer
- Larak, Iran (disambiguation):
  - Larak, Chaharmahal and Bakhtiari
    - Larak, Chalus, Mazandaran Province
  - Larak Island, in Hormozgan Province
  - Larak Rural District, in Hormozgan Province
