= United States strikes on Iran =

United States strikes on Iran may refer to:

- Operation Eagle Claw, a failed 1980 military operation in the Iran hostage crisis
- Operation Nimble Archer, a 1987 attack on oil platforms in the Iran–Iraq War
- Operation Praying Mantis, a 1988 naval offensive in the Iran–Iraq War
- Assassination of Qasem Soleimani, a 2020 attack in Baghdad, Iraq
- 2025 United States strikes on Iranian nuclear sites in the Twelve-Day War
- Operation Epic Fury, a military operation that initiated the 2026 Iran war
  - Assassination of Ali Khamenei, a US-assisted Israeli attack in Tehran, Iran
  - 2026 Minab school attack
  - 2026 Kharg Island attack
  - 2026 Larak Island attack
  - 2026 Kuhestak wedding airstrike

== See also ==
- 1953 Iranian coup d'état, the US-directed overthrow of the government of Mohammad Mosaddegh
- List of attacks during the 2026 Iran war
- List of wars involving Iran (after 1979)
- Lists of wars involving the United States
- Iran–Israel conflict
- Operation True Promise
- 2025–2026 Iran–United States negotiations
