= Kumzari =

Kumzari may refer to:

- Kumzari people, an ethnic group of Iranian and Arab origin who live in northern Oman
- Kumzari language, an Iranian language spoken by Kumzari people
