= Larak Shahri =

Village in Hormozgan province, Iran

Larak Shahri Persian: لارك شهري
- Village
- Location within Iran
- Coordinates: 26°53′01″N 56°23′17″E
- Country: Iran
- Province: Hormozgan
- County: Qeshm
- District: Central
- Rural District: Larak

Population (2016)
  - Total: 421
- Time zone: UTC+3:30 (IRST)

Larak Shahri (Persian: لارك شهري) (Note: Also romanized as Lārak Shahrī; also known as Lārak Kūhī.) is a village in, and the capital of, Larak Rural District of the Central District of Qeshm County, Hormozgan province, Iran. The village is located on Larak Island.

== Demographics ==
=== Language ===
The linguistic composition of the village:

Larak Shahri linguistic composition
Language	percent
Kumzari	75%
Shihhi Arabic	20%
New Persian	5%

=== Population ===
At the time of the 2006 National Census, the village's population was 466 in 98 households, when it was in Shahab District. The following census in 2011 counted 473 people in 109 households. The 2016 census measured the population of the village as 421 people in 115 households. It was the most populous village in its rural district.

In 2017, the rural district was separated from the district to join the Central District.
