= Regime change efforts in the 2026 Iran war =

Trump announcing the U.S.–Israeli strikes on Iran on 28 February 2026, encouraging regime change in the country

During the 2026 Iran war, the United States and Israel have sought strategies aimed at regime change in Iran, seeking to destabilize or overthrow the government through military strikes, leadership assassinations, and encouragement of internal uprising, as well as bringing an Iranian opposition friendly to the US and Israel to power. Shortly following the beginning of U.S.–Israeli strikes on Iranian targets and the assassination of Ali Khamenei on 28 February 2026, both U.S. President Donald Trump and Israeli Prime Minister Benjamin Netanyahu indicated that the goal of the strikes was regime change. The two leaders called on civilians to seize control of the government once its military and institutions were crippled and decapitated. Prominent Iranian opposition figures such as Reza Pahlavi, son of the last monarch of Iran, echoed Netanyahu and Trump's intentions, urging his supporters to stay at home and await his "final call" before overthrowing the government.

== Background ==
Although Mossad officials have long examined the possibilities of instigating uprisings against the Iranian government, they had dismissed such plans as futile and impossible to achieve, focusing on imposing crippling economic sanctions and assassinating Iranian nuclear scientists instead. Following the Twelve-Day War in June 2025, Mossad chief David Barnea reversed Mossad's approach and investigated plans to overthrow the government in the event of another war against Iran. US President Donald Trump floated the idea of regime change in Iran during the 2025 war, although vice president JD Vance, prior to Trump's online post, suggested that the US did not want to do regime change in Iran. In June 2026, Trump claimed that he "never cared about regime change" in Iran.

In the lead-up to the beginning of the Iran war on 28 February 2026, David Barnea devised a plan to overthrow the Islamic Republic of Iran by galvanizing the Iranian opposition after several days of U.S.–Israeli strikes and assassinations, prompting them to riot and rebel against the government, leading to its collapse. This would include decapitating the leadership of Iran and intelligence operations, somehow entailing a mass uprising. The plan was presented to Israeli Prime Minister Benjamin Netanyahu, who adopted the plan. It was also presented to senior Trump administration officials in mid-January 2026 who, despite doubts about its viability, expressed optimism. On 13 February 2026, Donald Trump publicly declared his support for regime change in Iran, calling it "the best thing that could happen," and indicating that "there are people" he wants to take over.

According to Israeli Defense Minister Israel Katz, Israel had been planning to strike Iran in mid-2026, however the timetable was moved earlier to February in light of the widespread 2025–2026 Iranian protests which had been ongoing since 28 December 2025. According to The New York Times, Israeli prime minister Benjamin Netanyahu made an hour-long presentation to Trump and his top aides in the Situation Room on 11 February 2026, contending that the Islamic Republic is ready to fall and that a U.S.–Israeli attack would result in a certain victory. While warned against following through with the operation by members of his cabinet, most notably JD Vance and General Dan Caine of the Joint Chiefs of Staff on 12 February, with CIA Director John Ratcliffe describing Netanyahu's outline as "farcical," Trump ultimately decided to go through with the operation, remarking "I think we need to do it" according to witnesses, on 26 February. Trump said that regime change is up to the Iranian people, showing primary interest in killing Iranian top leaders and dismantling the Iranian military.

== Timeline ==
=== Decapitation strikes ===
On 28 February 2026, the United States and Israel launched attacks on various Iranian military sites and leaders, which included the assassination of the Supreme Leader of Iran, Ali Khamenei. During his announcement of the strikes on Iran, Donald Trump called on the opposition to seize the opportunity to take over their government once the operation was over. Calling on them to seek shelter while the strikes continue, he stated "When we are finished, take over your government. It will be yours to take. This will be probably your only chance for generations." Trump also called on the Islamic Revolutionary Guard Corps (IRGC), the armed forces, and the police to "lay down your weapons and have complete immunity" otherwise "face certain death." Benjamin Netanyahu has also stated that the "crushing blows" delivered by the Israeli Air Force intend to achieve "optimal" conditions for the opposition to overthrow their government, assuring them "We are standing beside you and helping you. But at the end of the day, it’s up to you."

On 17 March, Israel assassinated Ali Larijani, the Secretary of the Supreme National Security Council who was often described as the de facto leader of Iran. Larijani was the number one target and most senior official to be killed after the assassination of Ali Khamenei. U.S.–Israeli strikes have also killed Basij commander Gholamreza Soleimani and targeted Basij and IRGC facilities nationwide.

=== Lack of uprising ===
Several weeks into the war, no large-scale uprising against the government has manifested. This could be a result of the explicit calls by prominent opposition leader Reza Pahlavi, the son of the former Shah, urging the opposition to "leave the streets and remain [at home]" and to wait for his "final call" before rising up.

Since the initial outbreak of the war, however, U.S. officials have largely ceased to speak of regime change, although Netanyahu continued to do so. Trump acknowledged the reluctance of protestors to take to the streets given their lack of weapons and the belief that Iranian security forces were "machine-gunning people down if they want to protest." Secretary of Defense Pete Hegseth downplayed the regime change element, claiming "this is not a so-called regime change war ... but the regime sure did change, and the world is better off for it."

On 20 March, Netanyahu said that "You can't do revolutions from the air" and therefore "There has to be a ground component as well," of which "there are many possibilities," and expressed hope that "the Iranian people will exploit the conditions we are creating for them to take to the streets." Trump meanwhile emphasized that the killing of Iranian leaders was in itself "regime change."

According to The New York Times, U.S. officials have shifted the definition of regime change in Iran, with Trump arguing "We’ve had regime change, if you look, already because the one regime was decimated, destroyed. They’re all dead" and that "The next regime is mostly dead. And the third regime, we’re dealing with different people." Secretary of State Marco Rubio, however, downplayed the regime change element, asserting that "our objectives here from the very beginning had nothing to do with the leadership."

On 1 September, following the September 2026 United States strikes on Iran, Trump once again called on the Iranian people to "rise up and fight" against their government.

=== Proposed Iranian Kurdish offensive ===
Among the plans to bring about regime change was militarily supporting and instigating an Iranian Kurdish offensive into Iran. According to reports, Trump administration officials have been contacting Iranian Kurdish opposition figures such as the Coalition of Political Forces of Iranian Kurdistan in Iraqi Kurdistan, with the goal of arming them to undertake a cross-border offensive into Iranian Kurdistan. The U.S. and Israel have offered aerial support. Israeli jets have been attacking Iranian targets in northwestern Iran to pave the way for Kurdish forces. While Israeli officials remain convinced of degrading Iranian military capabilities in western Iran to "open up the way to Tehran," American officials no longer seek to arm an Iranian Kurdish offensive.

Trump admitted to covertly arming Iranian Kurdish rebellion groups before the war was launched on 28 February 2026. He later accused the Kurds of hoarding weaponry provided to them by the US instead of engaging against Iranian forces, which was denied by Kurdish leaders.

== Proposed replacements ==
Trump noted challenges in identifying a viable successor to Ali Khamenei, stating that U.S.–Israeli decapitation strikes have killed many individuals previously considered as potential moderate and pragmatic alternatives. This therefore hinders efforts to implement the "Venezuela model"—a rapid decapitation of top leadership followed by installation of a compliant figure from within the existing system, similar to the January 2026 U.S. intervention in Venezuela that captured President Nicolás Maduro and elevated Vice President Delcy Rodríguez as interim leader under U.S. pressure.

Trump has also expressed skepticism about exiled Iranian opposition figures such as Crown Prince Reza Pahlavi, stating that "somebody from within, maybe, would be more appropriate" and questioning whether Pahlavi would garner sufficient domestic support.

On 19 May 2026, the New York Times reported that the United States and Israel had plans to install former Iranian President Mahmoud Ahmadinejad as Iran's leader in the early stages of the war, after assassinating Supreme Leader Ali Khamenei.

== Reactions ==
=== Saudi Arabia ===
According to American officials, the Crown Prince of Saudi Arabia, Mohammed bin Salman, pushed Trump to continue the war against Iran, arguing that the U.S.–Israeli campaign presents a "historic opportunity" for the Middle East. He reportedly argued by claiming that Iran poses a long-term threat to the Arab states of the Persian Gulf that can only be eliminated by getting rid of the government. Saudi Arabia reportedly sees a failed state in Iran as a grave and direct security threat. Saudi officials rejected the idea that bin Salman was pushing for a continuation of the war.

=== United Kingdom ===
Prime Minister of the United Kingdom, Keir Starmer, defended his initial decision to not permit the use of British bases for strikes on Iran, asserting that his government "does not believe in regime change from the skies."

=== Canada ===
Throughout the 2026 U.S. military buildup in the Middle East, Canada expressed support for regime change in Iran and imposed further sanctions. Canadian Prime Minister Mark Carney declared support for the U.S.–Israeli strikes on Iran. An Ipsos survey from March 2026 revealed that 61% of Canadians disapproved of the unilateral American and Israeli aggression in Iran, with 42% strongly disapproving of the strikes. However, per a poll from April 2026, 90% of Iranian Canadians supported the U.S. strikes and overthrow of the government in Iran.

=== European Union ===
President of the European Commission Ursula von der Leyen endorsed regime change in Iran, stating that "a credible transition in Iran is urgently needed."

=== Russia ===
Russia condemned the strikes on Iran and criticized attempts by external actors to pursue regime change, describing such approaches as destabilizing and contrary to international law. Russian Foreign Minister Sergey Lavrov stated that regime change narratives in Iran were linked to geopolitical and energy interests, and warned that continued intervention could further escalate regional instability. Russia also called for an immediate cessation of hostilities and emphasized the importance of resolving the conflict under United Nations frameworks.

=== China ===
China expressed opposition to any attempts at regime change in Iran, emphasizing that such actions lack public support and violate the principle of national sovereignty. Chinese Foreign Minister Wang Yi called for respect for Iran’s territorial integrity and urged all parties to cease military operations and return to diplomatic negotiations. Beijing also stressed that regional affairs should be resolved by the countries of the region without external interference, while warning that continued conflict could destabilize regional and global security.

== See also ==
- American expansionism under Donald Trump
- 2025–2026 Iranian de facto leadership speculations
- 2026 Strait of Hormuz crisis
