= Al-Iraqi =

Al-Iraqi (Arabic: العراقي, 'of/from Iraq'), may refer to:

== People born before 1900 ==
- Abū l-Qāsim al-ʿIrāqī al-Simāwī, 13th-century Muslim alchemist
- Zain al-Din al-'Iraqi (1325–1404), Shafi'i scholar and scholar of hadith
- Fakhr-al-Din Iraqi (1213–1289), or Al-'Iraqi, Persian Sufi master, poet and writer

== People born after 1900 ==
- Abdul Hadi al Iraqi (Nashwan Abdulrazaq Abdulbaqi, born 1961), alleged Al-Qaeda member
- Abdullah Abu Azzam al-Iraqi (died 2005), senior leader of Al-Qaeda in Iraq
- Abu Ayman al-Iraqi (Adnan Latif Hamid al-Suwaydawi al-Dulaymi, 1965–2014), ISIL commander
- Abu Ayoub al-Iraqi (fl. 1990s), a founder of Al-Qaeda
- Abu Hajer al-Iraqi (Mamdouh Mahmud Salim, born 1958), Sudanese co-founder of Al-Qaeda
- Abu Walid al-Iraqi (Khalid Duhham Al-Jawary, born c.1945), convicted terrorist
- Hatem Al Iraqi (born 1969), Iraqi songwriter and composer
- Shalash al-Iraqi (fl. 2005), the pseudonym of an Iraqi essayist and fiction writer

== See also ==
- Maqam al-iraqi, a genre of Arabic music
- Laraki (disambiguation)
