= 2026 Iranian pro-government rallies =

Iranian support to their government

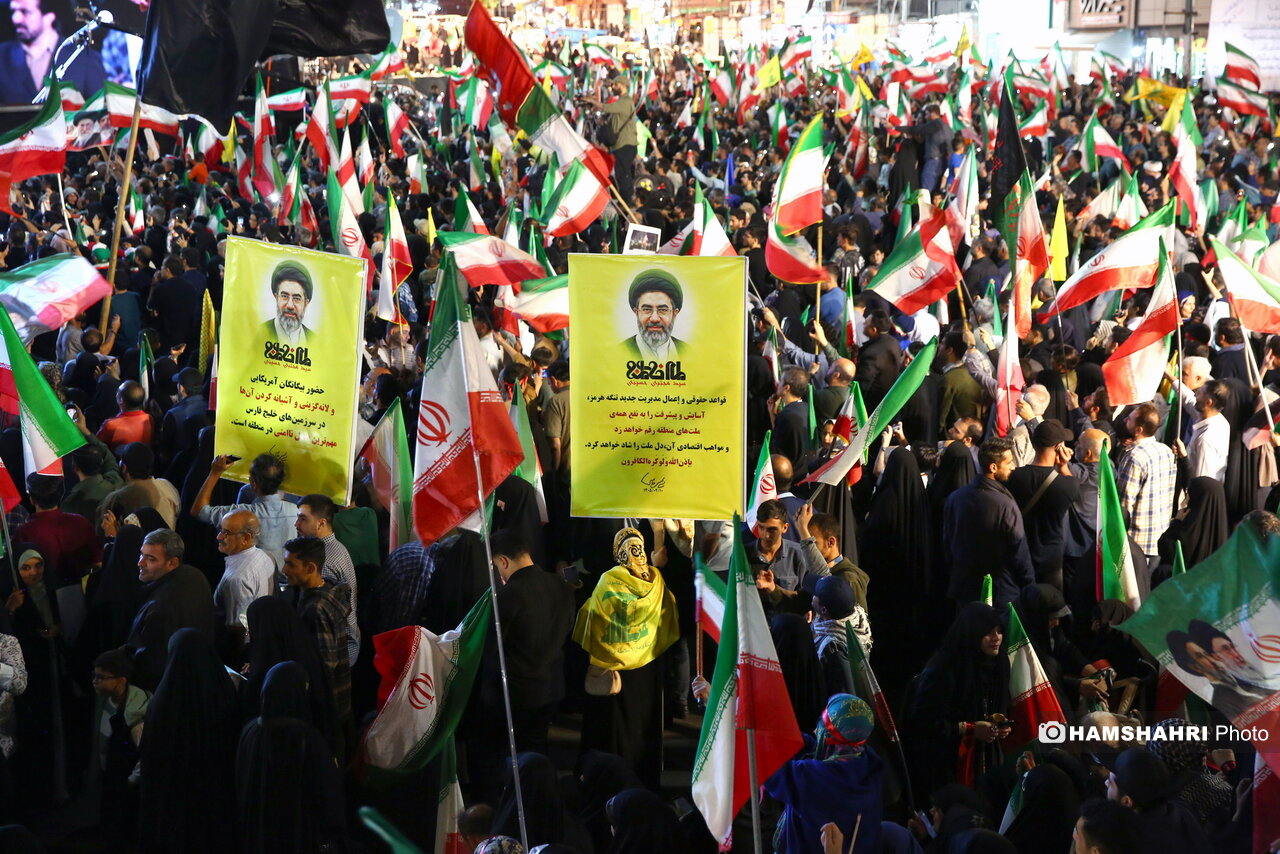
- Pro-government rally on May 4, 2026, in Tehran.
- Location: Iran

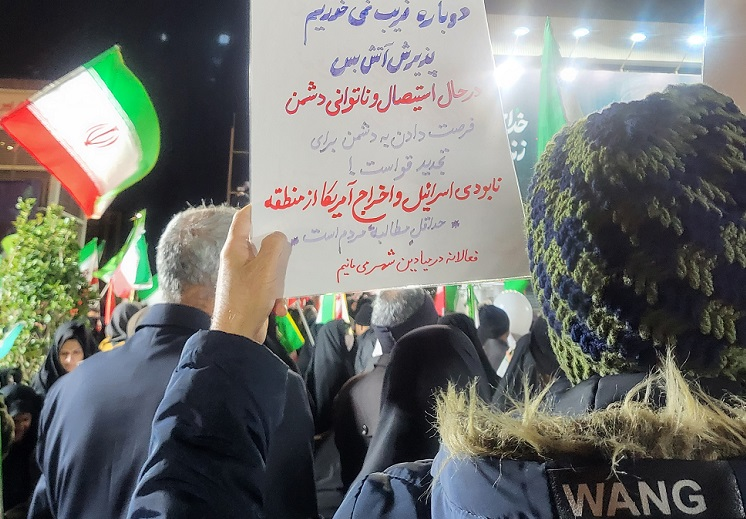
A placard reading: "We won't be deceived again. The ceasefire recharges the enemy. Our minimum demand is to terminate the Zionist regime and remove US military sites from the region. We remain on the streets."

Since the onset of the 2026 Iran war, Iranians have held nightly rallies in support of the Iranian government. The demonstrations have been held in multiple cities. Participants wave Iranian flags and chant in support of the government of the Islamic Republic of Iran. The rallies come as Iranian media highlights public backing amid the US-Israeli war with the country.

According to The Guardian, more than 850 pro-government demonstrations had taken place across Iran by March 2026. According to Iranian media, these gatherings have continued for 266 consecutive nights so far.

According to Iran International, critics view Iran's nightly pro-state rallies as a calculated tactic to intimidate dissent, monopolize public space, and inflict everyday disruptions like traffic jams and late-night noise.

The head of the Islamic Development Coordination Council of Tehran Province said: The gatherings in the squares will continue powerfully; and until the Supreme Leader of the Islamic Republic of Iran makes an (related) announcement, people will not leave the squares.

== Continuation of night gatherings ==
The head of the Islamic Development Coordination Council of Tehran Province said: The gatherings in the squares will continue powerfully; and until the Leader of the Islamic Republic of Iran makes an (related) announcement, people will not leave the squares. And it also mentioned that these gatherings are not limited to a specific time period and that people's presence in the squares will continue until further notice.

According to Iranian media, these gatherings have continued for more than 245 consecutive nights so far. Tehran IRGC Commander: People will stay on the streets as long as they deem necessary.

After 200 nights of the gatherings, Armed Forces spokesman Abolfazl Shekarchi said on September 16, 2026, that the people had disrupted the enemy’s plans by staying in the streets. He said the gatherings showed that there is a strong bond between the people, the leadership, and the armed forces. Shekarchi also said that the armed forces would defend Iran against its enemies, especially the United States and Israel, “to the last drop of blood and the last breath.”

Amoli Larijani, head of the Expediency Discernment Council, also wrote in a post on his personal page: “200 days of staying in the streets and fighting in the Strait of Hormuz have helped keep Iran safe.” He also said: “In the current war, only resistance can stop the enemy.”

=== Continuity in Tehran and other cities ===
According to The Guardian, more than 850 pro-government demonstrations had taken place across Iran by March 2026. Also, according to Iranian media, nighttime gatherings continue in 110 locations in Tehran;

In addition to the capital (Tehran), the night gatherings were/are also continued in all provincial capitals of Iran, such as: Mashhad, Isfahan, Qom, Tabriz, Karaj, Ahvaz, Shiraz, Kermanshah, Zanjan, Kerman, Hamedan, Urmia, Khorramabad, Yazd, Ilam, Sanandaj, Arak Birjand, Gorgan, Bojnord, Semnan, Qazvin, Bushehr, Bandar Abbas, Rasht, Sari, Yasuj, Shahrekord, Ardabil, etc.

In addition to provincial capitals, it has also been held in other Iranian cities and villages, among: Abadan, Khorramshahr, Mahabad, Kashan, Eslamshahr, Shahriar, Dezful, Shushtar, Bandar Anzali, Neyshabur, Sabzevar, Babol, Torbat-e Heydarieh, Torbat-e-Jam, Qaem Shahr, Sarakhs, Amol, Chalus, Behbahan, Behshahr, Babolsar, Andimeshk, Nowshahr, Shush, etc.

== Critics ==
According to Iran International, critics view Iran's nightly pro-government rallies as a deliberate form of intimidation and a means of denying public space to potential dissent. Following the mass protests of January, these gatherings have sent a clear, unyielding message that the streets belong exclusively to supporters of the Islamic Republic, stifling alternative political expression.

Beyond political suppression, detractors point to the more mundane yet relentless disruptions these nightly demonstrations inflict on ordinary citizens. Residents and social media users frequently complain about the exhausting traffic jams, road closures, and late-night loudspeaker noise that disturb neighborhoods, leaving everyday workers and tired drivers to bear the brunt of the gatherings.

== Surveys ==
The Deputy Vice President of Iran for Strategic Affairs stated: According to the latest survey, more than 56 percent of people across the country participated in this movement (night gatherings) at least once, and 42 percent were present most nights. According to the Islamic Republic of Iran Broadcasting Organization, based on surveys, 48.3% of people have participated in night gatherings or car convoys. Totally, 81.7% of them, have answered that it must continue until end of the war (or until people themselves recognize); including: 55.4% said that it should continue until the end of the war; and 26.3% said it should continue until people themselves recognize.

== Reactions ==
=== Domestic reactions ===
Some participants described the gatherings as a form of “national defence” against the United States and Israel, and framed participation in the rallies as a “national and religious duty” during what they viewed as a wartime situation. The rallies took place alongside broader political debate over whether Iran should pursue negotiations with the United States or adopt a more confrontational stance. In addition, some officials and supporters presented the demonstrations as a display of national unity and strength amid the ongoing conflict.

On 31 March 2026, Ayatollah Abdullah Javadi Amoli praised people who joined the nightly gatherings and called them “angels of the earth.” He said that people coming out into the streets show their support for the country’s defenders.

== Gallery ==
Spontaneous gatherings of Iranian people against Israel and America's attacks on Iran have been going on for 260 nights.

Sunday night, 14 June 2026, Khorasan Square, Tehran, Iran
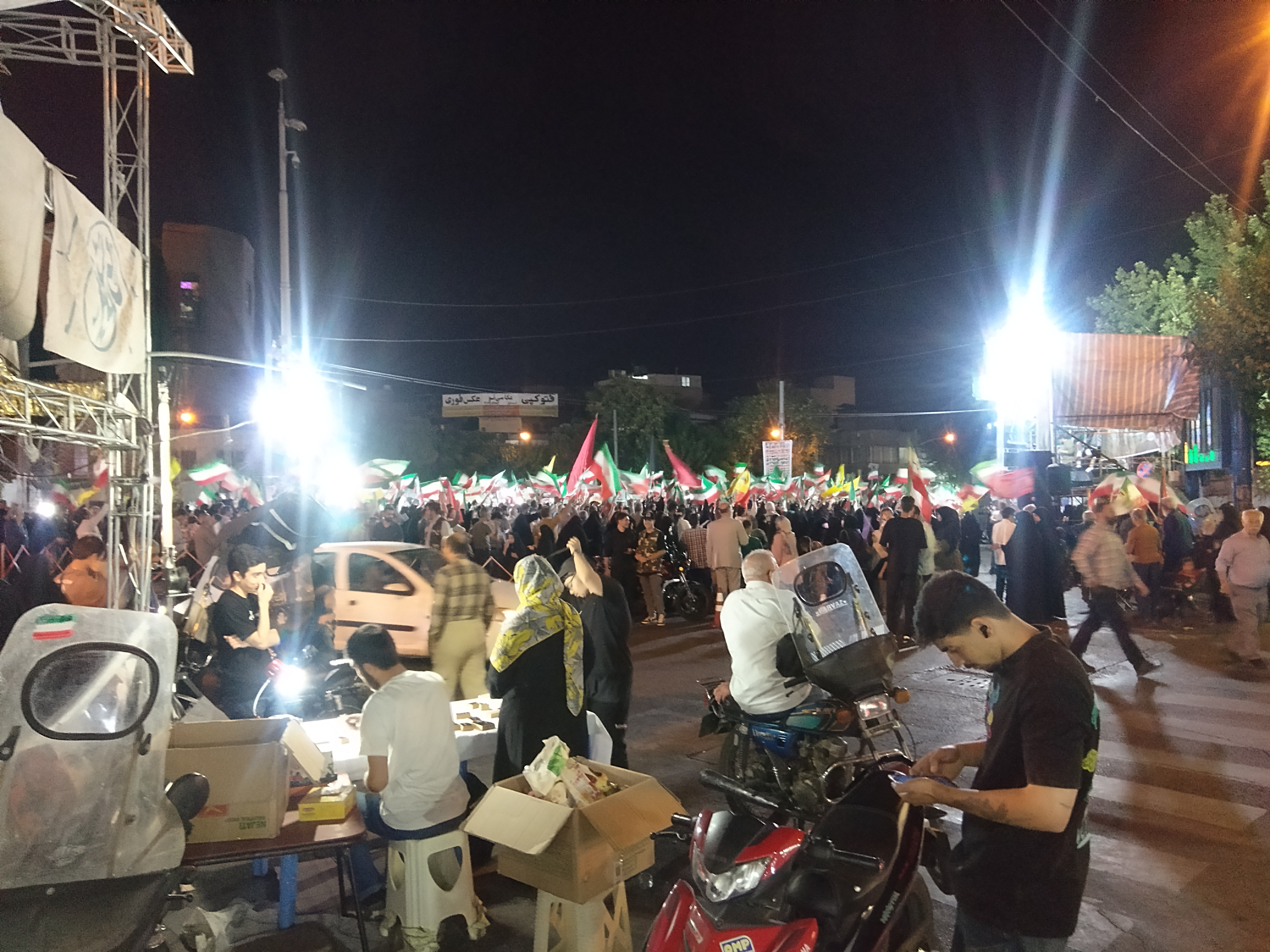

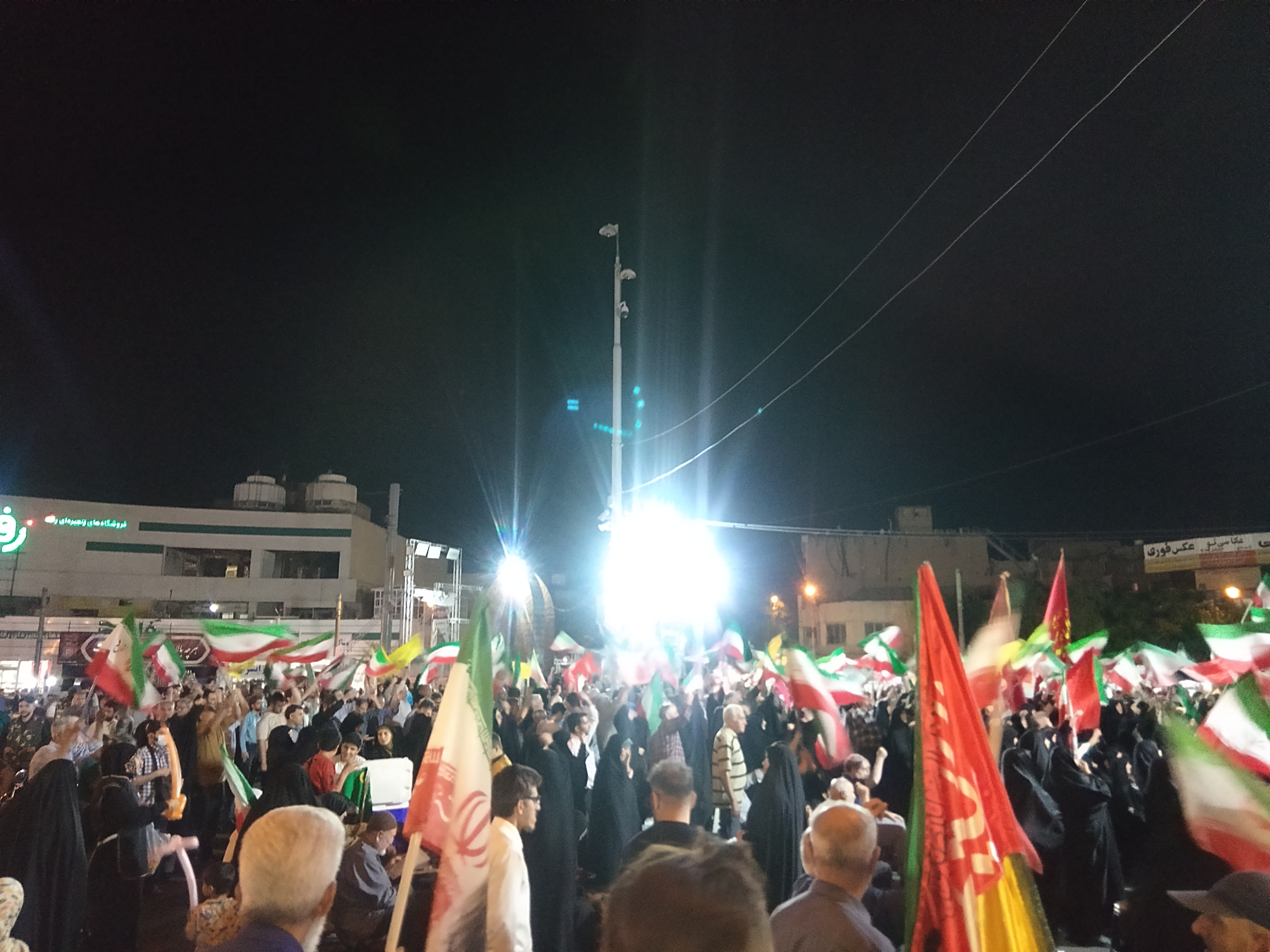

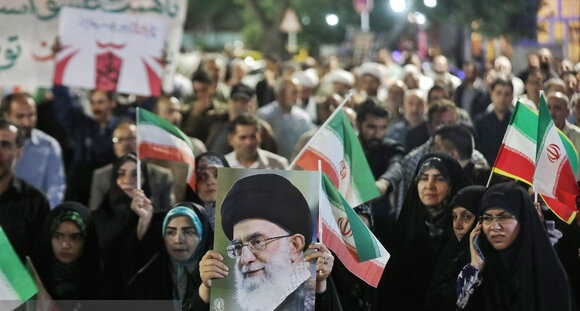

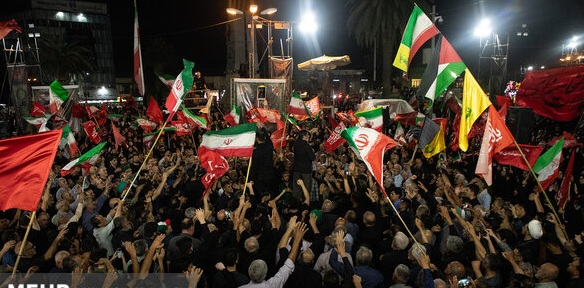

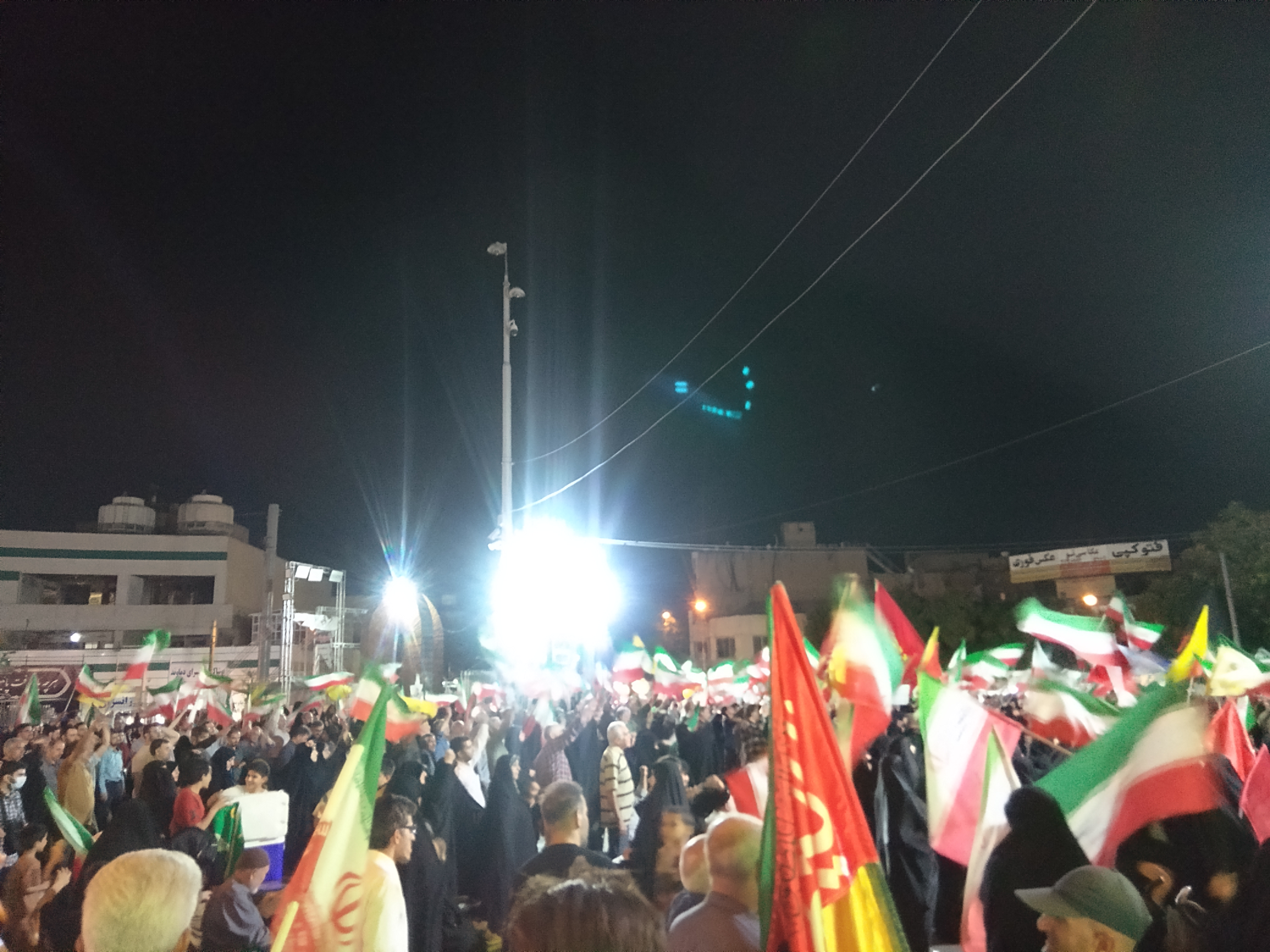

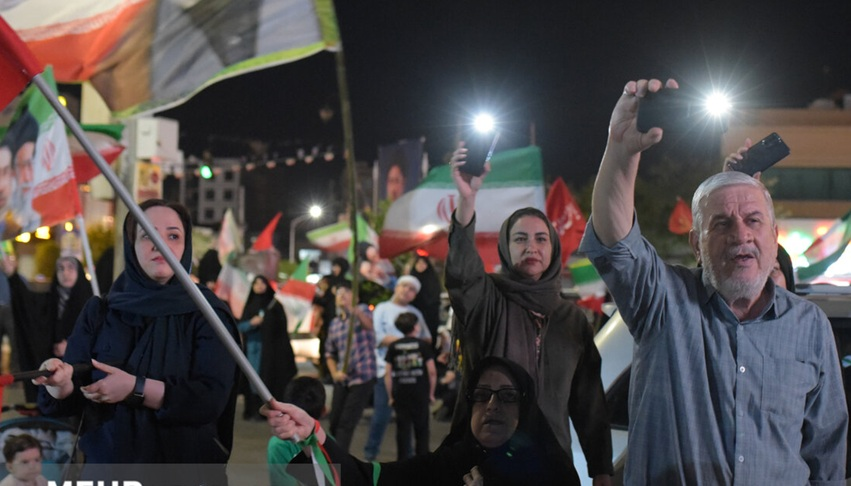

== See also ==
- 2024 Iran–Israel conflict
- 2025–2026 Iranian protests
- 2026 Iran war ceasefire
- Assassinations of Iranian nuclear scientists
- Background to the 2026 Iran war
- List of attacks during the 2026 Iran war
- Outline of the 2026 Iran war
- Sacrifice for Iran (campaign)
- Twelve-Day War
- 2025 United States strikes on Iranian nuclear sites
