= Larak, Iran =

Larak (Persian: لارك) in Iran, may refer to:

- Larak, Chaharmahal and Bakhtiari
- Larak, Chalus, Mazandaran Province
- Larak Island, in Hormozgan Province
- Larak Rural District, in Hormozgan Province
