= September 2026 United States strikes on Iran =

- Part of the 2026 Iran war
- Date: 1 September – 8 September 2026
- Location: Southern Iran, including Kenarak, Bandar Abbas and Qeshm Island
- Caused by: Alleged Iranian attacks on commercial shipping in the Strait of Hormuz and against US service members in the region; the 30 August 2026 Larak Island attack and subsequent Iranian retaliation against US-linked bases in Jordan
- Goals: Deterrence of attacks on shipping and US forces; degrading Iranian Revolutionary Guard Corps capabilities
- Methods: Airstrikes on Islamic Revolutionary Guard Corps targets
- Status: Ongoing

Parties
United States	Iran (Islamic Revolutionary Guard Corps)

Casualties and losses
- Not yet confirmed

The September 2026 United States strikes on Iran are a series of airstrikes launched by the United States against Islamic Revolutionary Guard Corps (IRGC) targets in southern Iran beginning 1 September 2026, marking an escalation of the ongoing 2026 Iran war. The strikes followed a similar exchange days earlier, when the US struck Iranian rocket launchers on Larak Island and Iran retaliated with missiles against US-linked bases in Jordan. The renewed strikes represented a shift by the administration of US President Donald Trump away from its recent strategy of relying primarily on economic sanctions, dubbed "Economic D-Day", back toward direct military action.

== Background ==
By late August 2026, the war between the United States, Israel and Iran had continued for roughly six months, with a 60-day ceasefire window having expired without a lasting resolution. In response, the Trump administration had shifted its emphasis toward a campaign of expanded secondary sanctions against Iran and its trading partners, announced under the name "Economic D-Day" on 19 August 2026. On 30 August 2026, in the first US military action in over a month, US forces struck two IRGC rocket launchers on Larak Island after Revolutionary Guard forces were reportedly observed preparing to launch rockets carrying sea mines into the Strait of Hormuz. The IRGC responded hours later with a missile and drone operation against the King Hussein and Al Azraq bases in Jordan, one of which hosts US air assets. On 31 August, Trump said during an Oval Office event that further strikes might be necessary. Attacks on shipping in the Strait of Hormuz continued to be reported almost daily; on 31 August, the UK Maritime Trade Operations (UKMTO) reported that an oil tanker had been struck by three unidentified projectiles while transiting the strait.

== Strikes ==
On 1 September 2026, US Central Command (CENTCOM) announced that US forces had begun striking IRGC targets around noon EDT, stating that "the strikes follow recent attempted attacks by the IRGC against commercial shipping in the Strait of Hormuz and against American service members deployed to the region". Iran's semi-official Tasnim News Agency reported explosions in southern Iran, including in Kenerak, Bandar Abbas and Qeshm Island.

Trump confirmed the strikes in a social media post, saying US forces were "as we speak" striking Iranian targets near the Strait of Hormuz, and described the action as retaliation "for the Iranians' failed attempt at adding sea mines to the Strait, which currently has no mines". He characterised the strikes as "large and powerful" and called them "very justified". Trump warned that if Iran retaliated, the US would respond "at a much harder and higher level," adding: "It will not be the biggest attack of them all, that is waiting in the wings and, when it is over, there will be very little left of the Islamic Republic of Iran".

On 8 September, US forces struck multiple Iranian oil tankers linked to the IRGC, after Iranian forces attempted further missile attacks on a US Navy warship, according to a US official. The Pentagon separately reported that 30 more US troops had been wounded in the war. In response, Iran's IRGC Navy warned crews aboard tankers near ports in Kuwait and Bahrain to evacuate their vessels immediately, saying the ships would be targeted in retaliation for the US strikes on Iranian tankers. Brent crude was trading at a seven-week high of about $97 a barrel amid the exchange, and the Iran-aligned Houthis in Yemen separately launched strikes on oil facilities in Saudi Arabia, which Riyadh answered with strikes of its own in the worst exchange since a truce four years earlier. A Navy official told the The Wall Street Journal that the United States had 19 warships supporting operations in the Middle East at the time.

The exchange followed a heavier round of fighting a week earlier: on 1 September 2026, the US launched a new wave of strikes on southern Iran, including on Sirik, Konarak, Bandar Abbas, Jask, Asaluyeh, Ahvaz and Qeshm Island, killing 11 people, including five at a wedding party, which Iran's foreign ministry described as a "war crime". Iran retaliated with strikes on US bases in Bahrain, Jordan and Iraq, in what was described as the heaviest exchange of fire between the two countries in over a month, while Kuwait said its air defences had also confronted Iranian drones and missiles.

== Reactions ==
Al Jazeera reported that, given Iran's pattern of responding to similar US attacks, the strikes risked sparking a renewed cycle of fighting between the two countries. Separately, Qatar said efforts were under way to help end the Iran–US war and reopen the Strait of Hormuz, while Iran and Russia said they would stand against what they described as US "unilateralism".

== See also ==
- 2026 Kuhestak wedding airstrike
