= Larak Castle =

Castle in Hormozgan Province, Iran

Larak castle
- قلعه لارک
- Interactive map of the Larak castle area

General information
- Type: Castle
- Location: Larak Island, Iran

Larak castle (Persian: قلعه لارک) is a historical castle located in Larak Island in Hormozgan Province, The longevity of this fortress dates back to the Safavid dynasty.
