= Ben Saul =

Australian professor of international law and UN special rapporteur

Ben Saul FASSA

Academic background
- Education: University of Sydney; Magdalen College, Oxford

Academic work
- Discipline: international law
- Institutions: University of Sydney
- Main interests: international aspects of anti-terrorism, humanitarian, and human rights law

Ben Saul FASSA is the current Challis Professor of International Law at the University of Sydney and an Australian Research Council Future Fellow.

Saul is an expert on international law, in particular, international aspects of anti-terrorism law, humanitarian law, human rights law, among others. In 2023 Saul was appointed the UN Special Rapporteur on the promotion and protection of human rights and fundamental freedoms while countering terrorism. He is the author of several books, including Defining Terrorism in International Law, and is a frequent contributor to media debates on topics relevant to his research and UN role.

== Early life ==
Saul was educated at the University of Sydney, graduating with a B.A. (Hons.) and LL.B. (Hons.), and Magdalen College, Oxford, where he received a D.Phil.

== Career ==
Saul has published articles in various international law journals and is the author of several books, including Defining Terrorism in International Law (2006).

He has appeared as an advocate in international, regional and national courts outside Australia, and he is also admitted to practice as a barrister in New South Wales.

Saul was elected a Fellow of the Academy of the Social Sciences in Australia in November 2022.

In November 2023, Saul was appointed UN Special Rapporteur on Counter-terrorism and Human Rights. His first report laid out his plans for his term, and stated he would continue his predecessor Fionnuala Ní Aoláin's focus on counterterrorism's impact on civic space, the dangers of mass surveillance and detentions of terrorist suspects, but that he would also focus on the risk that the use of “administrative measures” to restrict individual liberties to combat terrorism can threaten human rights, and the question of accountability and reparation for large-scale violations of human rights in the name of countering terrorism.

As UN Special Rapporteur, Saul is an active contributor to debates about topics relating to the role. He described the designation of Palestine Action as a terrorist group as "an unnecessary and disproportionate restriction" on fundamental human rights, and has argued that efforts to combat antisemitism must confront its causes and not just its symptoms. Saul has questioned the legality of Trump's proposal to take over Gaza, has criticised the 2025 US strikes on Iran as a breakdown of the rules-based order, and has argued that Australia and other nations should respond strongly to the 2026 United States strikes in Venezuela, which he described as returning "the Americas to an era of gunboat diplomacy by imperial warlords."

In September 2026, Saul released a briefing note concluding that U.S. military strikes on suspected drug-trafficking vessels in the Caribbean and Pacific violated international law and could amount to crimes against humanity. Drawing on 68 strikes that killed at least 223 people since September 2025, the report described the attacks as "serial extrajudicial killings" and stated there were "reasonable grounds to believe" they constituted "crimes against humanity of murder under customary international law." Saul rejected the U.S. claim of self-defence, arguing that drug trafficking does not meet the threshold of an armed attack and that less-lethal alternatives, such as maritime interception, were available.

== Books ==
- with Catherine Renshaw: International and regional protection of human rights in Asia and the Pacific. Routledge, 2014.
- Oxford Commentary on the International Covenant on Economic, Social and Cultural Rights (2014) (awarded a Certificate of Merit by the American Society of International Law)
- Research Handbook on International Law and Terrorism (2020)
- Oxford Guide to International Humanitarian Law (2020)
- Oxford Handbook on International Law in Asia and the Pacific (2019)
- Documents in International Law: Terrorism, Hart (2010)
- with Stephens, T., McAdam, J. and Sherwood, S., Climate Change and Australia: Warming to the Challenge (2010)
- with Nasu, H (eds), Human Rights in the Asia-Pacific Region: Towards Institution Building, Routledge-Cavendish: Abindgon (2010)
- Defining Terrorism in International Law (2006) (2008 paperback)
- Crock, M., Saul, B. and Dastyari, A., Future Seekers II: Refugees and Irregular Migration in Australia, Federation Press: Sydney (2006)
- Crock, M. and Saul, B., Future Seekers: Refugees and the Law in Australia, Federation Press and the Law and Justice Foundation of NSW: Sydney (2002)
