= Ibn Arfa' Ra's =

12th-century Maghrebi alchemist poet

ʿAlī ibn Mūsa ibn Arfaʿ Raʾs
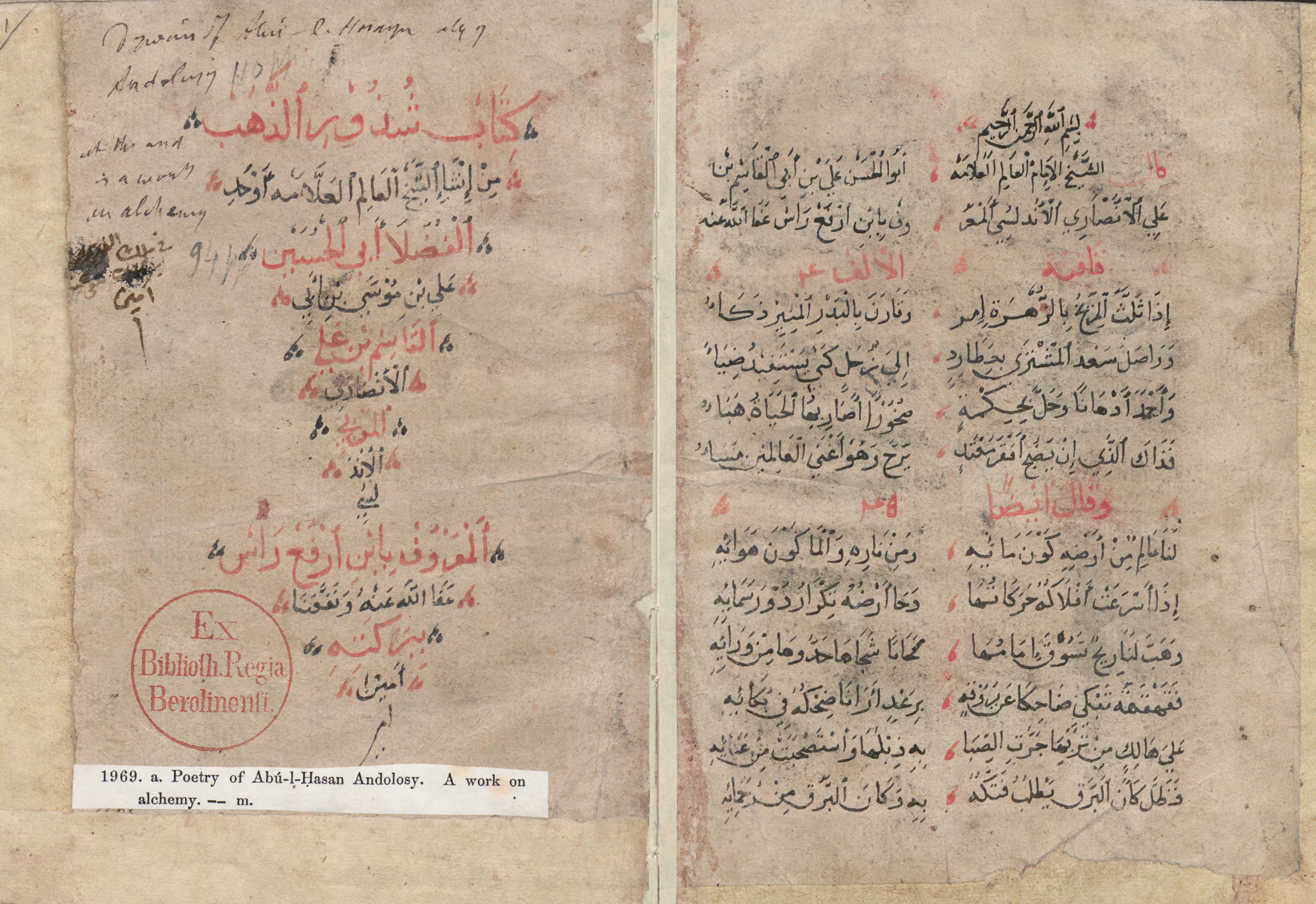
- Title page of Shudhūr al-dhahab in 17th-century manuscript (Berlin, MS Sprenger 1969)
- Region: Maghreb
- Period: Almohad, fl. most likely c. 1150–1200
- Known for: Alchemy, Arabic poetry
- Major writings: Shudhūr al-dhahab ('Shards of Gold'); Ḥall mushkilāt al-Shudhūr ('Solution to the Problems of the Shudhūr')
- Influence: Commentaries on his work were written by al-Irbilī, al-Sīmāwī, al-Jildakī.

Ibn Arfa' Ra's (Arabic: ابن أرفع رأس – full name: Abū al-Ḥasan ʿAlī ibn Mūsa al-Anṣārī al-Andalusī ibn Arfaʿ Raʾs), flourished second half of the twelfth century, was a Maghrebi poet and alchemist. He is the author of an Arabic collection (dīwān) of alchemical poems called the Shudhūr al-dhahab ('Shards of Gold'). (Note: Non-critical edition in Ghazzali 2018. Critical edition and translation of one chapter (the Rhyme in khāʾ) in Díaz-Fajardo 2025. Forster & Müller 2020, p. 375 and Müller 2022, p. 28 reported that Svetlana Dolgusheva is working on a critical edition, German translation, and commentary of the Shudhūr al-dhahab. The English translation of the title given here ('Shards of Gold') is the one used by Todd 2023.)

Traditionally he was identified with a certain Ibn al-Naqirāt, a religious scholar living in Fez (Morocco) who died c. 1197. However, this identification is probably spurious. If so, virtually nothing is known about Ibn Arfa' Ra's's life. Probably born in Al-Andalus, perhaps in Granada, it is likely that he spent most of his life in Almohad Morocco. At some point he likely traveled to the Islamic East, where he may also have settled.

Ibn Arfa' Ra's wrote a commentary on his own work Shudhūr al-dhahab under the name Ḥall mushkilāt al-Shudhūr ('Solution to the Problems of the Shudhūr'). (Note: Critical edition in Müller 2024.) He also wrote some alchemical poems in the muwashshaḥ genre (strophic verse) and a number of short prose works on alchemy. Two works on magic have also been attributed to him, but these are probably spurious.

== Identity ==
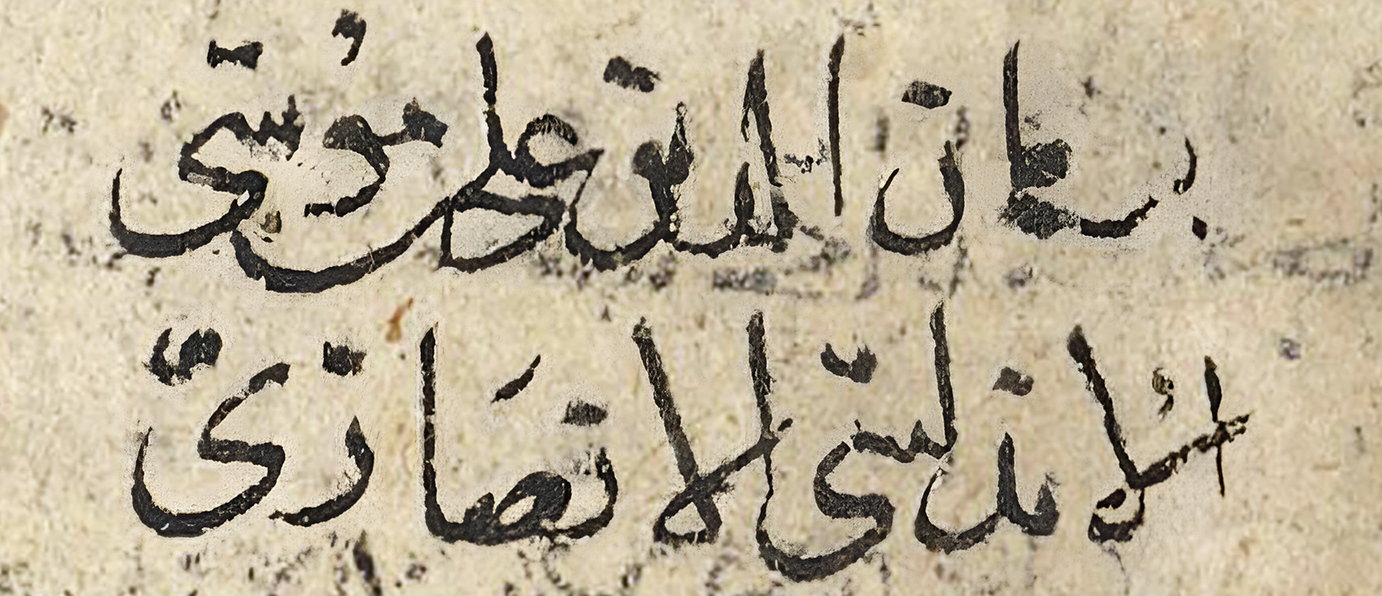
The author's name in a 14th-century manuscript of Shudhūr al-dhahab; it reads Burhān al-Dīn Abū al-Ḥasan ʿAlī ibn Mūsa al-Andalusī al-Anṣārī.

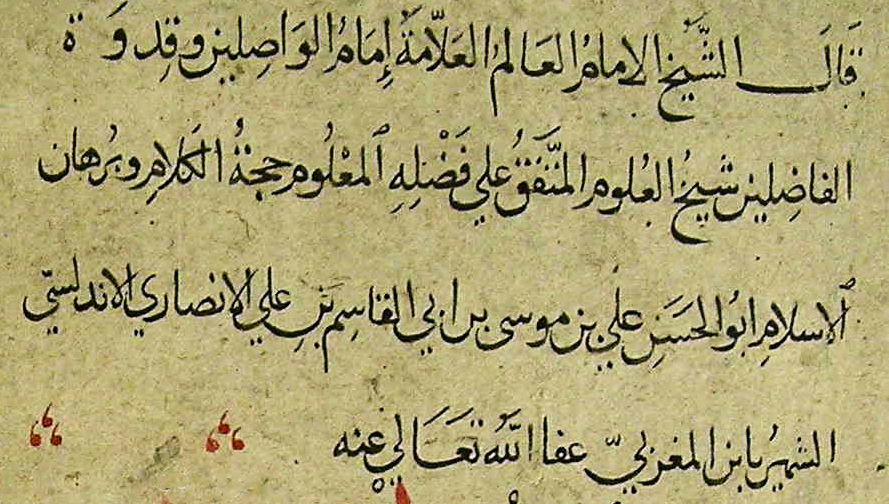
19th-century Ottoman manuscript, rendering the name as Abū al-Ḥasan ʿAlī ibn Mūsā ibn Abī al-Qāsim ibn ʿAlī al-Anṣārī al-Andalusī, known as Ibn al-Maghribī

Most traditional authors of Arabic biographical dictionaries identify Ibn Arfa' Ra's with a religious scholar called Ibn al-Naqirāt, (Note: His name may also have been vowelized as "Ibn al-Niqirāt", "Ibn al-Niqarāt", "Ibn al-Nuqirāt", etc. (the "a" and "i" in "Naqirāt" are conjectural); see Forster & Müller 2020, p. 382.) whose fuller name was Abū al-Ḥasan ʿAlī ibn Mūsa ibn ʿAlī ibn Mūsa ibn Muḥammad ibn Khalaf al-Anṣārī al-Sālimī al-Jayyānī. The fullest version of Ibn Arfa' Ra's's name, as may be reconstructed from the earliest manuscripts, is Burhān al-Dīn Abū al-Ḥasan ʿAlī ibn Mūsa ibn Abī al-Qāsim al-Anṣārī al-Andalusī. Since both names share the major part Abū al-Ḥasan ʿAlī ibn Mūsa al-Anṣārī, they are close enough to raise the possibility that the two figures were indeed identical. However, neither Ibn al-Naqirāt's longer nasab (the part of his name indicating lineage) "son of Ali son of Musa son of Muhammad son of Khalaf", nor his nisbas (names referring to a place of origin) al-Sālimī (Medinaceli) or al-Jayyānī (Jaén) ever occur in the alchemical manuscripts. The biographical dictionaries in their entries on Ibn al-Naqirāt never actually mention the nickname (laqab) Ibn Arfaʿ Raʾs, nor the honorific Burhān al-Dīn, both of which often feature prominently in the alchemical manuscripts.

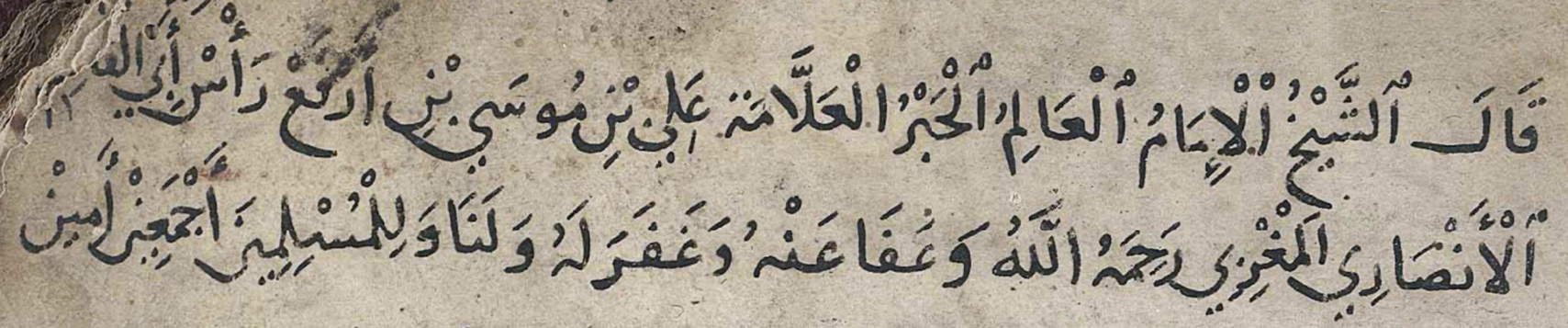
The author's name in a 15th-century manuscript of the Shudhūr al-dhahab, shown here as ʿAlī ibn Mūsa ibn Arfaʿ Raʾs Abī al-⟨Qāsim?⟩ al-Anṣārī al-Maghribī.

If Ibn Arfa' Ra's is identical with Ibn al-Naqirāt, some basic facts of his life are known. Ibn al-Abbar (died 1260) in his biographical dictionary Kitāb al-Takmila li-Kitāb al-Ṣila mentions that Ibn al-Naqirāt was born in 1121 or 1122 CE (515 AH) and that he died after 1196 or 1197 CE (593 AH), and that he was born in Al-Andalus but later moved to Fez (Morocco) where he became a khaṭīb (Islamic preacher). According to the broader biographical tradition, Ibn al-Naqirāt was an expert in qirāʾāt (variant readings of the Quran) as well as in the jurisprudence and hadith of the Maliki school, preaching in the renowned Qarawiyyin mosque.

However, the divergence between the names in the biographical dictionaries and those given in the manuscripts of the alchemical works attributed to Ibn Arfa' Ra's, as well as certain details in reports relating to the two figures given by Ibn Khaldun (1332–1406) and Leo Africanus (c. 1494 – c. 1554), suggest that Ibn al-Abbar may have conflated the alchemist Ibn Arfa' Ra's with the religious scholar Ibn al-Naqirāt. In this case, very little remains that can be said about the life of Ibn Arfa' Ra's. Like Ibn al-Naqirāt, he originated in Al-Andalus, perhaps in Granada, and later settled elsewhere. Although the fact that he was sometimes called al-Maghribī indicates that he may also have settled in Morocco, the alchemical manuscripts make no mention of Fez or any other specific place. Alternatively, the nisba al-Maghribī may indicate that he left the Maghreb (the Islamic West, the region west of Egypt) and settled in the Mashreq (the Islamic East). In any case, it is clear that he spent a major part of his life in the West, most likely in Morocco.

If the identification of Ibn Arfa' Ra's with Ibn al-Naqirāt is given up, the period in which he lived becomes very uncertain. Since Ibn al-Abbar knew of his works in the middle of the thirteenth century and some of the earliest commentaries on his work date from that period, Ibn Arfa' Ra's must have lived before c. 1250, but a terminus post quem is much harder to establish. The fact that Ibn Arfa' Ra's cites al-Mas'udi (died 957) may provide the earliest date for which there is hard evidence, although the lack of any mention of him by the alchemist poet al-Tughra'i (died 1121) makes it most likely that Ibn Arfa' Ra's lived in the twelfth century.

== Works ==
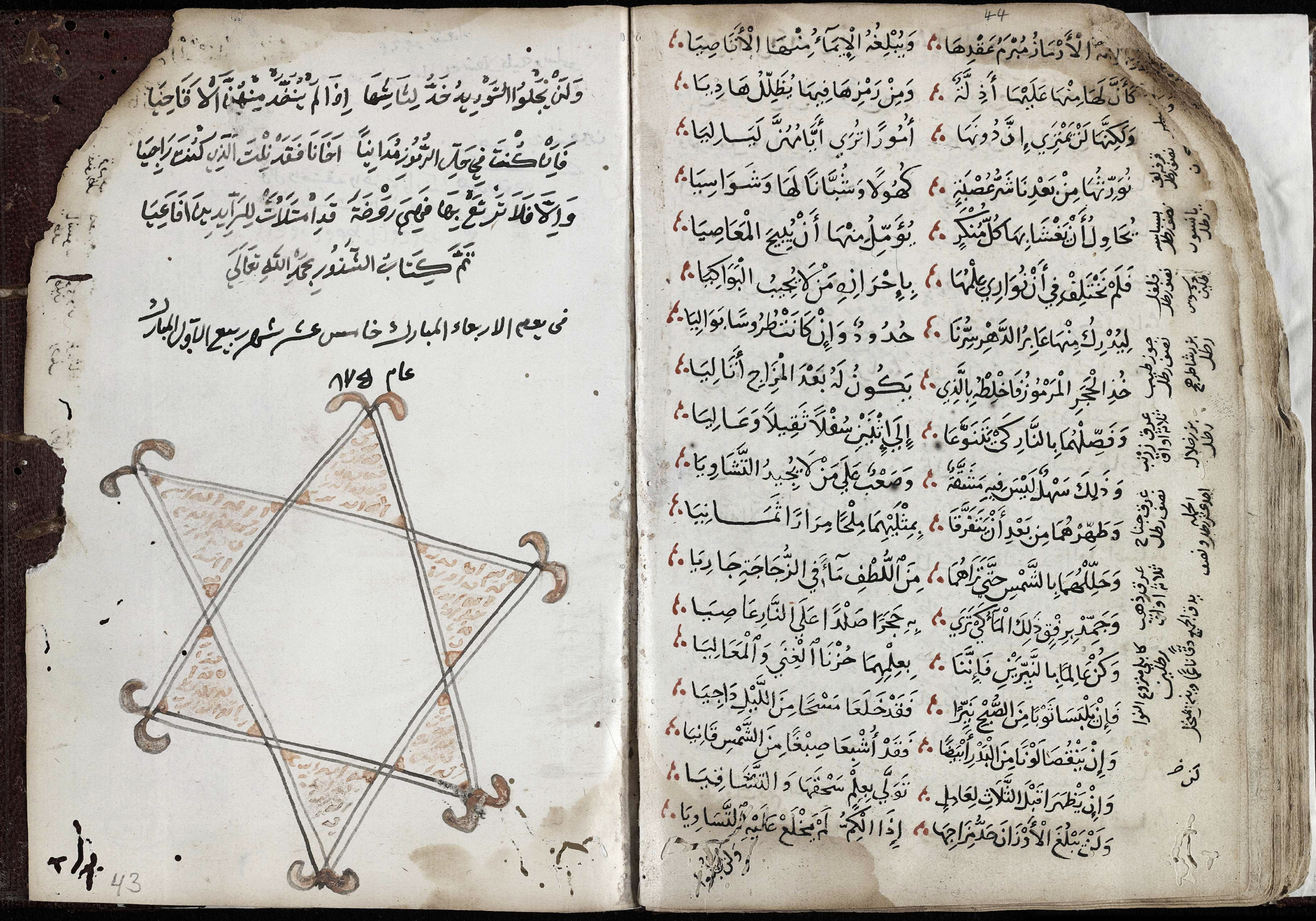
Ending of Shudhūr al-dhahab from a 15th-century manuscript

=== Shudhūr al-dhahab ===
Ibn Arfa' Ra's's most enduring work is a dīwān of alchemical poems called the Shudhūr al-dhahab ('Shards of Gold'). These poems, which all together comprise about 1400 lines, are arranged by the letter they use to rhyme, thus covering the entire Arabic alphabet. A large number of commentaries on the work were written by other Islamo-Arabic alchemists, among them commentaries by al-Irbilī (died 1257) and al-Sīmāwī (fl. 1250), as well as five commentaries by al-Jildakī (written c. 1337 – c. 1342) alone.

The Shudhūr al-dhahab ranks among the first works to feature exegesis of the Quran (tafsīr) in an alchemical context.

=== Other works ===
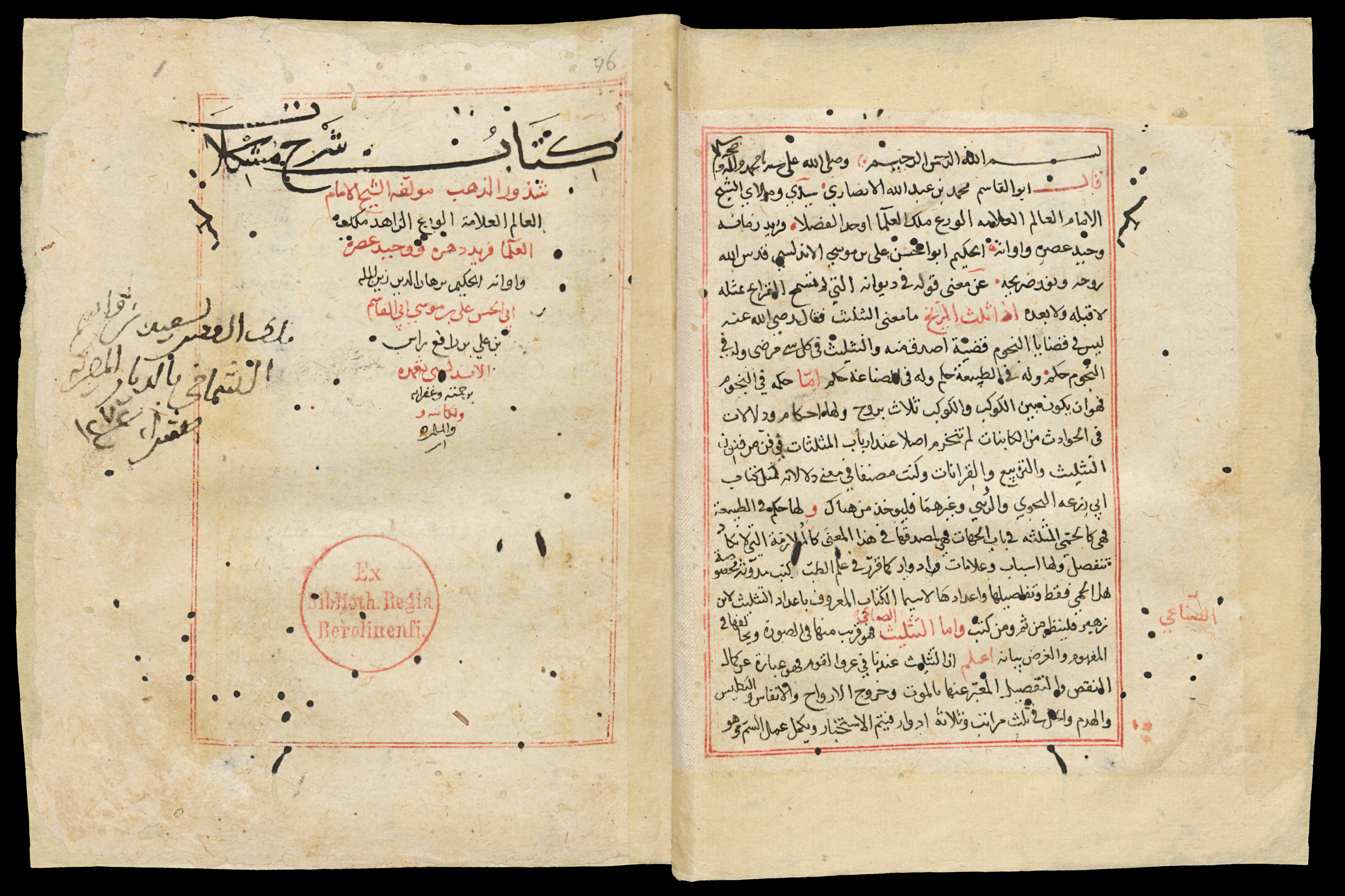
17th-century manuscript of Ḥall mushkilāt al-shudhūr

Ibn Arfa' Ra's wrote a commentary on his own alchemical dīwān, called the Ḥall mushkilāt al-Shudhūr ('Solution to the Problems of the Shudhūr').

There are also some alchemical poems by Ibn Arfa' Ra's which are written in muwashshaḥ, a genre of Arabic poetry that uses strophic verse. These were not included in the Shudhūr al-dhahab because poems of the muwashshaḥ genre are usually excluded from dīwān collections.

A number of short prose works have been attributed to Ibn Arfa' Ra's, but these have not yet been investigated:

- Fī tarkīb al-iksīr al-ḥayawānī al-insānī
- Risāla fī al-kīmiyā
- Tartīb al-iksīr

A work on magic called al-Ṭibb al-ruḥānī bi-al-Qurʾān al-raḥmānī ('Spiritual Medicine through the Merciful Quran') has been attributed to Ibn Arfa' Ra's, but this attribution is clearly spurious since the work heavily borrows from thirteenth–fourteenth century works on magic like those written by pseudo-al-Būnī and Ibn Sabʿīn. The case of al-Jihāt fī ʿilm at-tawajjuhāt, another work on letter magic attributed to Ibn Arfa' Ra's, is less certain, but the fact that its author holds magic in higher regard than alchemy suggests that it was not written by a devoted alchemist like Ibn Arfa' Ra's.

There is also a commentary on Ibn al-Fāriḍ's (1181–1235) wine poem which may have been authored by Ibn Arfa' Ra's, although this would necessitate placing Ibn Arfa' Ra's's lifetime in the thirteenth century rather than the twelfth, which is not very likely.

== Bibliography ==
=== Primary sources ===
- Díaz-Fajardo, Montse, ed. (2025). "Alchemy beneath Poetry: Ibn Arfaʿ Raʾs's Rhyme in khāʾ". Oriens. doi:10.1163/18778372-12340046. (critical edition and translation of one chapter in the Shudhūr al-dhahab, the Rhyme in khāʾ)
- Ghazzali, Lahouari, ed. (2018). Shudhūr al-dhahab. Dīwān Ibn Arfaʿ Raʾs al-Jayyānī al-Andalusī. Beirut: Dār al-kutub al-ʿilmiyya. (non-critical edition of the Shudhūr al-dhahab)
- Müller, Juliane, ed. (2024). Kitāb Ḥall mushkilāt al-Shudhūr. In the transmission of Abū al-Qāsim Muḥammad b. ʿAbd Allāh al-Anṣārī. By Abū al-Ḥasan ʿAlī b. Mūsā al-Anṣārī al-Andalusī, known as Ibn Arfaʿ Raʾs. Bibliotheca Islamica. Vol. 62. De Gruyter/Dār al-Fārābī. doi:10.1515/9783110779356. ISBN 978-614-485-165-4. (critical edition of the Ḥall mushkilāt al-Shudhūr)

Forster & Müller 2020, p. 375 and Müller 2022, p. 28 reported that Svetlana Dolgusheva is working on a critical edition, German translation, and commentary of the Shudhūr al-dhahab.

=== Secondary sources ===
- Braun, Christopher; Forster, Regula (2020). "Alchemist und Magier? Ibn Arfaʿ Raʾs im Kontext der arabisch-islamischen Gelehrsamkeit". In Eming, Jutta; Wels, Volkhard (eds.). Der Begriff der Magie in Mittelalter und Früher Neuzeit. Wiesbaden: Harrassowitz Verlag. pp. 15–33. doi:10.13173/9783447115094. ISBN 978-3-447-11509-4.
- Braun, Christopher; Forster, Regula (2021). "The Alchemist's work: Ibn Arfaʿ Raʾs and the reception of his collection of alchemical poems Shudhūr al-dhahab". Asiatische Studien – Études Asiatiques. 75 (2): 611–636. doi:10.1515/asia-2020-0033.
- Forster, Regula (2021). "Alchemical stanzaic poetry (muwashshaḥ) by Ibn Arfaʿ Raʾs (fl. twelfth century)". Asiatische Studien – Études Asiatiques. 75 (2): 637–664. doi:10.1515/asia-2020-0009.
- Forster, Regula; Müller, Juliane (2020). "The Identity, Life and Works of the Alchemist Ibn Arfaʿ Raʾs". Al-Qanṭara. 41 (2): 373–408. doi:10.3989/alqantara.2020.010.
- Müller, Juliane (2022). "Planets in Alchemy: Commentaries and Glosses on the Opening Verses of Ibn Arfaʿ Raʾs's Shudhūr al-dhahab". Journal of Arabic and Islamic Studies. 22 (1): 1–30. doi:10.5617/jais.9570.
- Todd, Richard (2016). "Alchemical Poetry in Almohad Morocco: The Shudhūr al-dhahab of Ibn Arfaʿ Raʾs". Oriens. 44 (1–2): 116–144. doi:10.1163/18778372-04401006.
- Todd, Richard (2021). "Classical poetic motifs as alchemical metaphors in the Shudhūr al-dhahab and its commentaries". Asiatische Studien – Études Asiatiques. 75 (2): 665–683. doi:10.1515/asia-2020-0043.
- Todd, Richard (2023). "Alchemical tafsīr: Qur'anic Hermeneutics in the Works of the Twelfth-Century Moroccan Alchemist Ibn Arfaʿ Raʾs". Islam and Christian–Muslim Relations. 34 (3): 285–302. doi:10.1080/09596410.2023.2283677.
