= 2025–2026 Iranian de facto leadership speculations =

Theories about a de facto leadership in Iran

Various speculations about a de facto leadership in Iran came up during the 2025 Twelve-Day War and currently come up during the 2026 Iran War, following the assassination of the Supreme Leader Ali Khamenei.

== Twelve-Day War ==
An IRGC military junta with a "War Council" that it established was seen as the de facto leadership of Iran, due to the reason that Ali Khamenei couldn't be contacted at the time. Further Khamenei was also reportedly replaced by Mohammad Bagher Ghalibaf, speaker of the Parliament of Iran as war decision maker, according to the Minister of Islamic Culture and Guidance and Tourism, while according to himself Khamenei was the one personally in charge of war decision making, because of this, it was assumed that he would rise to power. Ali Larijani tried to rescue Iran, because Khamenei couldn't be reached, however Larijani wasn't seen as the de facto leader, but was rather seen as de facto second-in-command when he became Secretary of the Supreme National Security Council.

== 2025–2026 protests and 2026 Iran war ==
=== Speculation about Ali Larijani and the IRGC ===
Ali Larijani who was the Secretary of the Supreme National Security Council during the 2025–2026 protests and was the perpetrator of the 2026 Iran massacres, the Süddeutsche Zeitung noticed his power during this time and described him as the de facto leader since then. In early January 2026, it was reported that a de facto collective leadership rules Iran. The Times of Israel later reported that, on the 22 February 2026, Ali Khamenei appointed Ali Larijani to a "key role" to manage the crisis; due to this it was reported that he became the real leader. After the assassination of Ali Khamenei, the speculation that Larijani was the real leader of Iran arose. After the assassination of Ali Larijani, Israel's Prime Minister Benjamin Netanyahu and the IDF said that Larijani was the real ruler of Iran and that he was part of a gang that ruled Iran. Reportedly, the IRGC supported Larijani.

In March 2026, it was reported that the IRGC seeks to assume power. After Larijani's death on the 17 March 2026, it was speculated again that the IRGC actually rules Iran, similar to during the Twelve-Day War. Reports between 20 March and 1 April 2026 show that Ahmad Vahidi, Zolghadr and Rezaei (Mohsen Rezaee) are practically controlling the country with a "Military Council" they established, blocking the attempts of Pezeshkian to appoint a new intelligence minister. It is said that all candidates including Hossein Dehghan were rejected by Vahidi. It is said that he insists that during wartime all critical and sensitive leadership positions, must be decided by the IRGC. Vahidi, Zolghadr and Rezaei are seen to be part of a military junta, which gets called "Mullah Junta Regime" or "Clerical-military junta". William “Chip” Usher argues that the Islamic Republic of Iran is currently under a de facto martial law. Article 79 of the Constitution of the Islamic Republic of Iran forbids the proclamation of martial law without the approval of the Islamic Consultative Assembly. As of May 2026, Ahmad Vahidi is still considered to be the real ruler of Iran.

=== Speculations about Mojtaba Khamenei's Supreme Leadership ===
An Iranian official told The Telegraph: "No one knows anything about Mojtaba, whether he is alive or dead or how badly injured. We are all just told that he's injured. He has no control over the war because he is not here. The majority of commanders, or more correctly, all commanders, have no news about him." Because of this several senior Iranian clerics called for the return of the Interim Leadership Council. The Washington Post says that Khamenei is believed to be "badly wounded." According to a report in The Times, Khamenei is unconscious and has been receiving medical treatments for a "severe" medical condition in Qom. The latest reports indicate that Khamenei is still unconscious, which would bring into question who currently leads the Islamic Republic of Iran.

In September 2026, Assembly of Experts member Mohsen Heydari said in an interview with Al Araby that Khamenei had been wounded during the 28 February attacks on the leadership office and subsequently hospitalized. According to Heydari, three hospitals in Tehran were later bombed, with Khamenei inside the third hospital when it was struck, after which he was pulled from the rubble. Heydari further stated that the Assembly of Experts later received information indicating that Khamenei was in good health and remained capable of carrying out the duties of Supreme Leader.

== Speculations which came out to be false ==
=== Speculations about Ghalibaf ===
From 28 February 2026 to March 2026 on Mohammad Bagher Ghalibaf also was regarded as one of the de facto leaders, in mid April 2026, Mohammad Bagher Ghalibaf was once again been regarded as the new leader of Iran, which however was proven as wrong later.

== See also ==
- Regime change efforts in the 2026 Iran war
