= Sacrifice for Iran =

Iranian social mobilization movement

The Sacrifice for Iran (Persian: جان‌فدا; Janfada) campaign is a social mobilization movement that emerged in 2026 under the direction of Iranian authorities. The campaign was launched following threats by the United States to target Iranian islands during the 2026 Iran war. The campaign reportedly attracted millions of registrants, with organizers claiming that more than 31 million people enlisted, but providing no evidence to support the claim. Critics and members of the Iranian diaspora have questioned the accuracy of these figures, citing a lack of independently verified data. The campaign’s international recruitment activities have drawn scrutiny from some governments, including the United Kingdom, that expressed concern over promotional efforts targeting Iranians abroad and warned of possible risks of incitement to violence.

== 313,000 Sacrifices for Iran ==
"Janfada-ye Iran" exercise, Tehran, September 18, 2026

On Friday, September 18, 2026, the "313,000 Sacrifices for Iran" military exercise, under the slogan "Labbaik ya Khamenei," was held from Imam Hossein Square to Revolution Square, with marches by Basij groups and other groups of people. According to General Hassan Hassanzadeh, commander of the IRGC in Tehran, more than 600,000 people had registered to participate in the Tehran rally. The aim of the exercise was to show people's support for the Islamic Republic and their readiness to defend the country against the United States and Israel.

=== Media coverage ===
The Los Angeles Times reported that hundreds of thousands of Iranians took part in a government-organized rally in Tehran and said they were ready to take up arms. Some participants trampled on U.S. and Israeli flags and chanted "Death to America" and "Death to Israel." The newspaper described the rally as the largest since the start of U.S. and Israeli attacks.

== Janfada military training ==
On September 23, 2026, military training for volunteers of the Janfada began at Imam Hussein Square in Tehran, attended by Hossein Taeb, the commander of the IRGC Basij Force.

Sasan Zare, spokesperson for the Janfada campaign, said the training covers local security, readiness for war, surveillance, intelligence, drone operation, the use of shoulder-fired weapons, and first aid. He said some of the training would take place at military centers and some in public squares. A fully equipped military training area was also set up at Imam Hussein Square in Tehran for practical training.

On October 3, 2026, the second Janfada military training center was opened in Haft-e-Tir Square, Tehran.

Iran's "Janfada" women receiving military training at Imam Hussein Square in Tehran on September 23, 2026

Military training of Janfada volunteers at Imam Hussein Square in Tehran on September 23, 2026

== 40,000-Motorcycle Parade ==
40,000-Motorcycle Parade in Tehran on September 25, 2026

On Friday, September 25, 2026, thousands of motorcyclists took part in the "40,000-Motorcycle Parade" as part of the Janfada movement to defend the country. The motorcyclists paraded through Tehran’s main streets in support of the Islamic Republic and chanted slogans such as "Death to traitors to the homeland" and "Labbaik ya Khamenei." Police officers, civilian families and their children were also among the participants. Many participants also carried the Iranian flag and images of Mojtaba Khamenei and Ali Khamenei.

== Events in other provinces ==
On September 27, 2026, the "Janfada-ye Iran" military exercise and gathering were held in the cities and islands of Hormozgan Province. This program was held in Bandar Abbas, Minab, Hajjiabad, Bashagard, Rudan, Jask, Sirik, Bandar Khamir, Bandar Lengeh, Parsian, Bastak, Qeshm, Kish, Abu Musa, and Hormuz.

On September 29, 2026, the "Janfada-ye East Azerbaijan" military exercise was held in Tabriz along with a military parade.

On October 1, 2026, the "Janfada-ye Isfahan" gathering was held with the participation of various groups of people. Participants chanted the slogan "We are the people of Isfahan, we sacrifice ourselves for Iran."

The Janfada exercises were held in Zanjan and Karaj on Thursday, October 1, and Friday, October 2, respectively, with the participation of people from different groups.

On October 6, 2026, the largest human chain of Janfada volunteers, stretching 8 kilometers, was held at Ferdowsi University of Mashhad, with the participation of students, academics, and the people of Mashhad.

== See also ==
- Reactions to the 2026 Iran war
- 2026 Iranian pro-government rallies
- List of islands of Iran
- 2026 Kharg Island attack
- 2026 Strait of Hormuz campaign
- Protests against the 2026 Iran war
