= Kumzar =

Kumzar كُمْزَار (in Arabic)
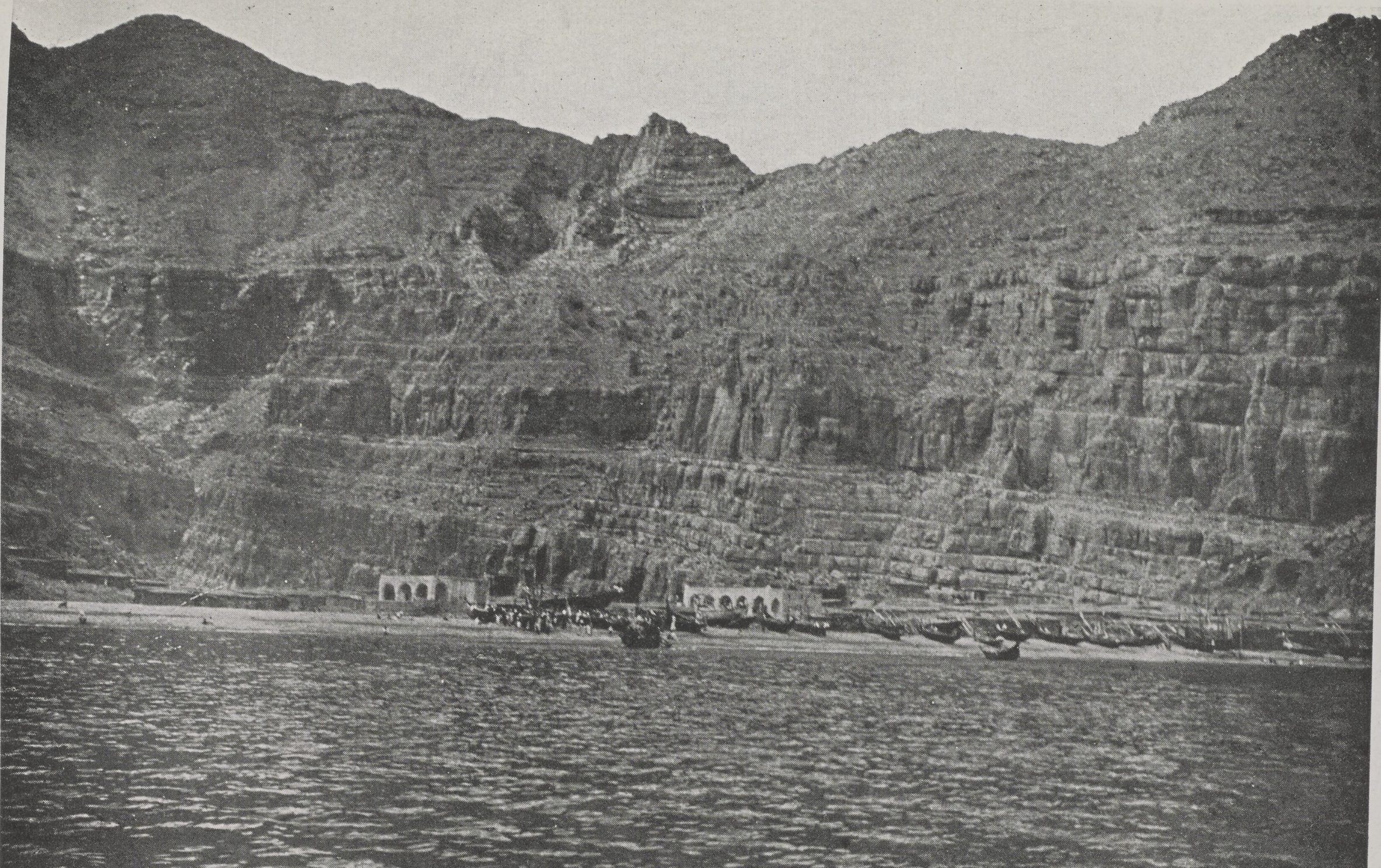
- Kumzar, c. 1908
- Interactive map of Kumzar
- Location in Oman Kumzar (Persian Gulf)
- Coordinates: 26°20′12″N 56°24′35″E
- Country: Oman
- Governorate: Musandam
- Province: Khasab

Area
  - Total: 3.61 km^{2} (1.39 sq mi)
  - Land: 3.61 km^{2} (1.39 sq mi)
  - Water: 0 km^{2} (0 sq mi)

Population (2010-12-12)
  - Total: 1,378
  - Density: 381.4/km^{2} (988/sq mi)

Kumzar (Arabic: كُمْزَار), is a village in Musandam, the northernmost province of Oman. It is the second most northerly inhabited part of the country, and the most northerly inhabited part on its mainland, located on the Strait of Hormuz. The village is only accessible by boat, and its inhabitants speak their own language, known as Kumzari.

== Etymology ==
There are multiple hypotheses on the origin of the name 'Kumzar.' A large number of native Kumzaris believe that the name was derived by blending the two Arabic words 'kam' and 'zar,' which means 'How many [people] visited [the village]?' This indicates that there has been a large number of visitors, owing to the village's strategic location.

Less common views maintain that the name is a blend of two other Arabic words – 'kummah' and 'wzar,' which refer to a cap worn on the head and a wrap worn around the body. Some scholars view the name as an exonym based on how the inhabitants of the village used to dress, while others hold the view that the mountainous landscape of the village resembles the shape of a kummah and wzar.

== Geography ==
Kumzar is located in the Musandam Governorate of Oman, and is the country's northernmost inland population center. It is located on the coastline, facing the Strait of Hormuz, and is situated between the inlets of a canyon.

Kumzar is an isolated village. With no road linking it to the nearest town of Khasab, it is only accessible by boat.

== History ==
Kumzar has been inhabited for approximately 500 years, although exact records are scarce. Early Portuguese maps of the area highlight a settlement in the area.

== Demographics and culture ==
The village has around 3000 inhabitants, and the majority of families have several children, with an average of 5-6 children per family.

=== Religion and language ===
The Kumzari people practice the religion of Islam, but have a distinct culture from the Arabs in the rest of Oman.

The isolated location of the village has harboured a separate language, Kumzari. The language is a Southwestern Iranian language that has been influenced by up to 45 languages, including Arabic, Larestani, English and Hindi.

=== Relationship with Khasab ===
Most Kumzari families have two houses, one in Kumzar and the second in Khasab. The extreme heat in the summer makes Kumzar almost uninhabitable, so from May to September, most people leave Kumzar to stay in Khasab, where they also help the locals at Khasab harvest dates.

In Khasab, the Kumzari are isolationist, living in their own separate district close to the sea.
