= Al-Jildaki =

Medieval Egyptian alchemist, chemist, doctor and writer (d. 1342)

ʿIzz al-Dīn al-Jildakī
- Egyptian Arabic: عز الدين الجلدكي; Coptic: Ⲉⲍ ⲉⲗⲇⲓⲛ ⲉⲗϫⲗⲇⲕⲓ
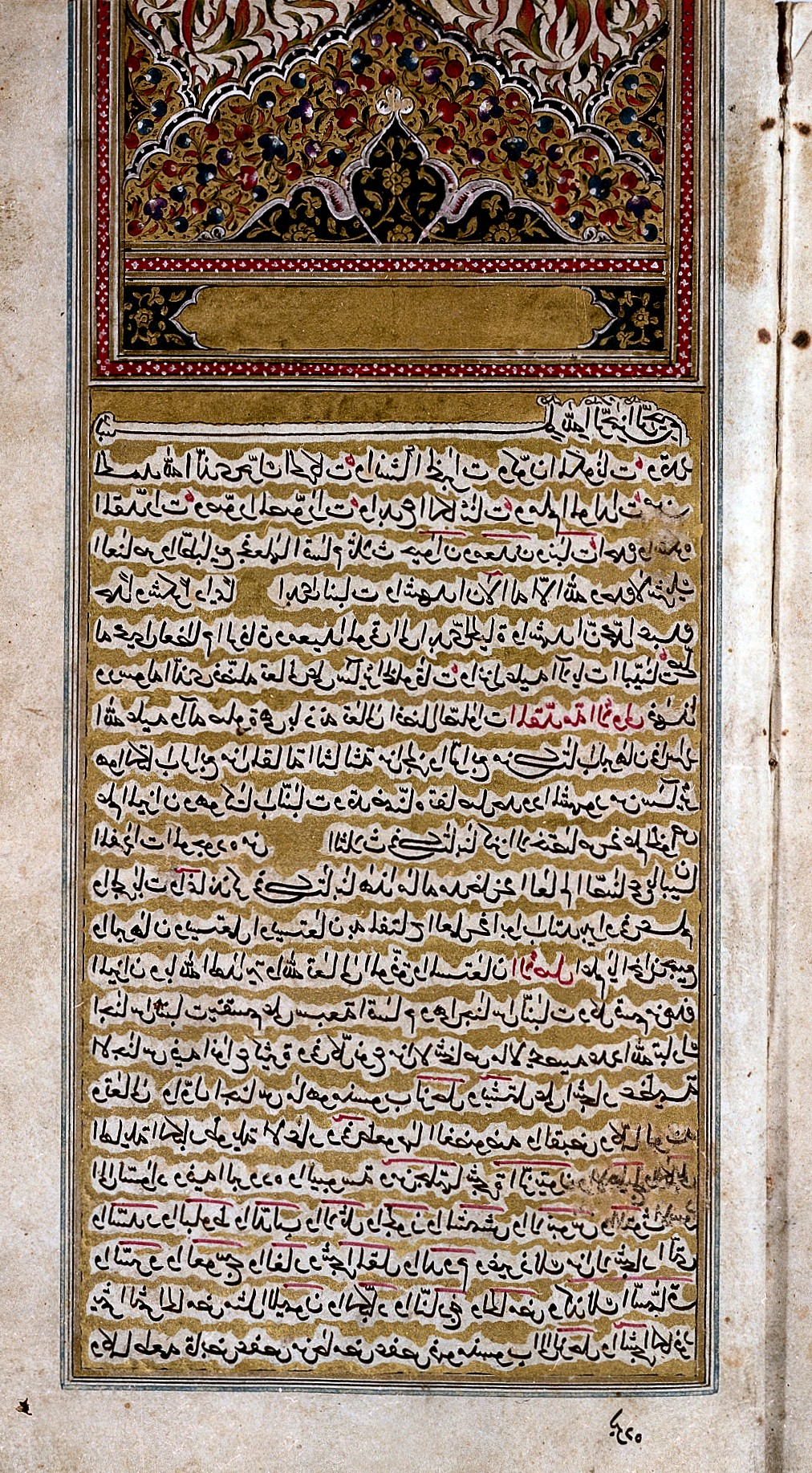
- al-Jildaki, Demonstration of secrets of the balance
- Born: Likely Cairo, Egyptian Mamluk Sultanate (present-day Egypt)
- Died: 1342 CE (743 AH); Cairo, Egyptian Mamluk Sultanate (present-day Egypt)
- Occupations: Chemist, Doctor, Writer
- Known for: laying the basic building block for the creation of the "Law of definite proportions" in chemical union, and explaining it in detail
- Notable work: al-Misbah fi Ilm al-Miftah; al-Burhan fi asrar 'ilm al-mizan

Ali bin Mahammad Aydamir or ʿIzz al-Dīn al-Jildakī (Egyptian Arabic: عز الدين الجلدكي; Coptic: Ⲉⲍ ⲉⲗⲇⲓⲛ ⲉⲗϫⲗⲇⲕⲓ), also written al-Jaldakī (d. 1342 CE / 743 AH) was an Egyptian alchemist from the 14th century Mamluk Sultanate of Egypt. A scientist and author who specialized in chemistry and lived in the eighth century AH. He copied entire paragraphs from the works of Jabir bin Hayyan, Abu Bakr al-Razi, Ibn Arfa` Ras, Abu al-Qasim al-Iraqi, and others, thus serving the history of chemistry in Islam, as he recorded in his works much of what had disappeared from the books of his predecessors. Haji Khalifa, the author of "Kashf al-Zunun", stated that al-Jildakī has 26 books.

== Life ==
Despite being one of the most important Islamic scholars of the 14th century, almost nothing is known about his early life.

Al-Jildaki was probably born in Egypt. In his writings he reveals that he spent seventeen years traveling through Iraq, Anatolia, Yemen, North Africa, and Syria. Historical scholars almost unanimously agree that he belongs to Egypt, so they called him al-Masry (the Egyptian).

Based on a speculative vocalization of his Nisba as "al-Jaldaki ", some 20th century writers like Henry Corbin suggested that he was originally from Jaldak, a town in Khorasan before emigrating to Egypt. Nicholas G. Harris has criticized this theory noting that it was never mentioned in any pre-modern source before. Instead, he notes that all the biographical information known about him –like his Turkic name "Aydamir", places of residence and native language – would make sense only when set against a Mamluk background. Harris further notes that the name "Jildak" and its derivative Nisba "Al-Jildaki" are attested Turkic names, especially among Mamluk amirs.

Al-Jildaki was one of the last and one of the greatest of medieval Islamic alchemists, he was the author of scientific works such as the al-Misbah fi Ilm al-Miftah (المصباح فی علم المفتاح, Key of the Sciences of Lights) and alchemical treatise Kitab al-Burhan fi asrar 'ilm al-mizan (کتاب البرهان فی اسرار علم المیزان, The Proof Regarding Secrets of the Science of the Balance).

He was a prolific author of alchemical writings, of which the United States National Library of Medicine has three. His treatises, which reflect interests much broader than simply alchemy, preserve extensive quotations from earlier authors.

== Works ==
Al-Jaldaki grew up loving science, and devoted himself to reading all the chemistry books he could find, and read them critically. He was fascinated by Jabir ibn Hayyan, to the point that he called him "the Imam". He collected 42 works from his books that he studied and discussed. He also read Al-Razi and other scientists, and made many comments and many explanations of some theories and mysterious issues in chemistry.

He is famous for his concern for the authenticity of transmission, so his works are considered of high value to historians of science. In addition, his collection of the works of the predecessors in chemistry, his preservation of them, and his analysis of their content preserved much of the heritage that was lost from them. He was also fond of the natural sciences and plants, and was keen to delve into their topics and read the most important books on these sciences. He did not leave a book on chemistry without reading and commenting on it. He was known for his generosity, piety, spreading knowledge, and caring for seekers of knowledge. He would open his home to students of knowledge, and would open his heart to anyone who asked him for questions or clarification on issues of chemistry or other branches of knowledge. Al-Jaldaki was distinguished by his writing in a style that was difficult to understand. Some people sometimes accuse him of being a style that is closer to talisman for the average reader, but this does not fault him because he was writing for specialists in the field of chemistry.

Manouchehr Taslimi mentioned in his doctoral thesis from the University of London in 1954 that Al-Jaldaki spent seventeen years on his scientific travels. He laid the basic building block for the creation of the "Law of definite Proportions" in chemical union, and explained it in detail, which Kepler, Galileo, and Newton later relied on in their studies. It is the law that Joseph Proust, who was born five centuries after Al-Jaldaki, falsely claimed for himself. Al-Jaldaki developed a chemical method for separating gold from silver by nitric acid, a method still used today. He gave a detailed description of the method of prevention and necessary precautions against the danger of inhaling gases resulting from chemical reactions, and thus he was the first to think of inventing and using respirators in chemistry laboratories. His contributions extended to the in-depth study of alkalis and acids, which enabled him to make some improvements to the method of soap making that was known at the time. He explained the currently used distillation method, such as filter papers, distillation under a water bath, and double distillation. He was the first to say that the substance gives its own color when burned. He also researched various fields, in addition to chemistry and botany, such as mechanics, acoustics, and air and water waves. He made comments, explanations, and corrections to many chemistry books written by his predecessors, Western scientists. Al-Jaldaki was aware of the electronic structure of the atom, as he compared it to the Solar System in his famous poetry and wrote many scientific books that were circulated in many libraries around the world, but most of them are still in manuscript form.

Omar Rida Kahhala says in his book العلوم البحتة في العصور الإسلامية Pure Sciences in Islamic Ages:

"...However, Al-Jaldaki is considered one of the greatest scholars knowledgeable about the history of chemistry and what was written about it before him. He was fond of collecting chemical works and interpreting them, and it was his habit to quote entire paragraphs from famous people who preceded him, such as Jabir bin Hayyan and Abu Bakr Al-Razi. Thus, he performed a great service for the history of chemistry in Islam, as he recorded in his relatively recent books what had disappeared and been lost from the books of his predecessors. His works were the best source for knowledge of chemistry and chemists in Islam.

Al-Jaldaki was one of the scientists who believed that base metals could be transformed into precious metals, by making elixirs. Therefore, he collected the most famous Arabic works on this science that appeared in the East and West of the Islamic world, and studied and explained them. Ahmad Shawkat Al-Shatti says about him in his book مجموعة أبحاث عن تاريخ العلوم الطبيعة في الحضارة الإسلامية A Collection of Research on the History of the Natural Sciences in Islamic Civilization:

"Al-Jaldaki is one of the famous scientists in chemistry, not only among Western and Muslim scientists, but also among chemists in general."

Eric John Holmyard says about him in his book Makers of Chemistry:

"Al-Jaldaki is truly considered one of the scientists who have a great role in the science of chemistry. Al-Jaldaki was very interested in reading what was written about the science of chemistry, so he took from his readings and analysis a way to build a scientific path in the science of chemistry. This is what is called the literature of Egyptian and Islamic chemistry. Al-Jaldaki carried out experiments in the field of chemistry, and although most of his work is analytical, he is one of the scientists to whom modern scientists owe a great deal."

Al-Jaldaki has important opinions in chemistry, including: that chemical substances do not interact with each other except in certain proportions, and this was the basis for the law of definite proportions in chemical reactions. He also reached the possibility of separating gold from silver by nitric acid, which dissolves the silver, leaving pure gold. He was interested in studying the properties of mercury, because he believed that all stones had their origin in mercury. Eric John Holmyard mentions in his book Chemistry to the Time of Dalton:

"Al-Jaldaki concluded with complete aplomb that substances do not interact with each other except in fixed proportions and weights."

Abdul Razzaq Nofal adds in his book "المسلمون والعلم الحديث Muslims and Modern Science":

"Five centuries after Al-Jaladaki's death, the scientist Joseph Proust announced the law of definite proportions in the chemical union, and its meaning is the same as Al-Jaldaki's theory."

== Books ==
He has a book entitled natayij al-fikr fi 'ahwal al-hajar (نتائج الفكر في الكشف عن أحوال الحجر, The Results of Thought in Revealing the Conditions of Stone), which he wrote in Cairo in the year 742 AH/1341 AD. The Zahiriyya Library in Damascus contains several rare manuscripts containing some of his works:

- al-Burhan fi asrar 'ilm al-mizan (کتاب البرهان فی اسرار علم المیزان, The Proof Regarding Secrets of the Science of the Balance). This manuscript contains eight articles and 224 pages. In this book, Al-Jaldaki sought to achieve the following matters:
1. Explanation of the book of Apollonius of Tyana called "The Secret of Creation and the Work of Nature in the Seven Bodies," known as the "Book of Causes".
2. Explanation of Jabir ibn Hayyan's book on bodies, and most of Jabir's books of scales were also mentioned in it.
3. Mentioning some theories related to the science of mechanics, the science of sounds and waves that travel in water and air, relying on the works of Ibn al-Haytham, al-Tusi, and al-Shirazi.

It contained many laws from nature regarding the chemistry industry. This book was detailed and classified, indicating Al-Jaldaki's depth in the method of scientific research. The book contains eight articles on divine wisdom and hidden secrets. The first article includes the introduction, the second on the origins of the four elements and what relates to the scales of each one of them, and the third on humans, animals, plants, and minerals and their features. The fourth examines the seven bodies, Saturn, Jupiter, Mars, the Sun, Venus, Mercury, and the Moon and their features. The fifth deals with salts. The sixth deals with adornments. The seventh deals with certainty about the balances of the mineral bodies and the wisdom of their manufacture and in explaining metals. The eighth deals with the implications of the science of balance and work to arrive at the preparation of the elixir and its benefits, followed by the conclusion.

- Nihayat al-Talb fi Sharh Kitab al-Muqtasab fi Ziraeat al-Dhahb (نهاية الطلب في شرح كتاب المكتسب في زراعة الذهب, The end of the request in explaining the book acquired in the cultivation of gold). There are three manuscripts of it in the Zahiriyya Library, one of which is complete and two of which contain text. Al-Jaldaki mentioned in the introduction to the book the reasons that prompted him to classify it. He mentioned that he was able to solve the problems of the science of the ancients, and what was transmitted from the virtuous masters of wisdom... after taking the path of request and diligence, and spending a fortune of life and money, and migrating to the sheikhs and notables, within the borders of Iraq and the outskirts of the Romans, to the borders of Morocco, the lands of Egypt, and the outskirts of Yemen, the Hejaz, and the Levant, for a period of more than seventeen years, he studied the Jabriya methods in business, and looked into the secrets of nature and impossibilities. George Sarton said about it in his book "Introduction to the History of Science": "It is considered one of the most important books produced by the Egyptian mind. Because of the accurate information it contains, it is based on the production of giants of Islamic scholars such as: Jabir bin Hayyan and Al-Razi."
- al-Misbah fi Ilm al-Miftah (المصباح فی علم المفتاح, Key of the Sciences of Lights). Al-Jaldaki divided this book into four sections, and each section has ninety keys. This book includes many topics, including: the manufacture of chemistry and metallurgy, medicine and anatomy, animal generation, elixirs, the cultivation of gold and silver, the science of divine craftsmanship, the science of sacred stones, drugs and medicines, human natures, zodiac signs, and talisman.
- Matalie Al-Badur fi Sharh Diwan al-Shadhur (مطالع البدور في شرح ديوان الشذور) and Al-Badr al-Munir fi Marefat al-Elixir (البدر المنير في معرفة الإكسير): two small treatises written by al-Jaldaki, in the first of which he explains three verses from the beginning of the Diwan al-Shadhur by Sheikh Burhan al-Din Ali bin Musa al-Andalusi, known as Ibn Arfa' Ras (515-593 AH/ 1121-1196 AD). As for the Al-Badr Al-Munir, Al-Jaldaki explained the ninth verse of the Diwan Al-Shadhur in it.
- "The Luminaries of Luminous Thoughts in Explanation of the Paper Water and the Astral Earth": It is a manuscript in the Explanation of the Five Books of Abu Abdullah Muhammad bin Amil Al-Tamimi.

== Death ==
Historical sources differed on the date of his death. Some references stated that he died in 743 AH / 1342 AD, and the German orientalist "Karl Brockelmann" stated that he died in 762 AH / 1361 AD.

== Sources ==
- C. Brockelmann, Geschichte der arabischen Litteratur, 1st edition, 2 vols. (Leiden: Brill, 1889–1936). Second edition, 2 vols. (Leiden: Brill, 1943–49). Page references will be to those of the first edition, with the 2nd edition page numbers given in parentheses, vol. 2, p. 138-9 (173-5)
- Corbin, Henry (2014). History of Islamic Philosophy. Routledge. pp. 331–332. ISBN 9781135198893.
