= 2026 Kuhestak wedding airstrike =

US strike in Iran

- Part of September 2026 United States strikes on Iran and 2026 Iran war
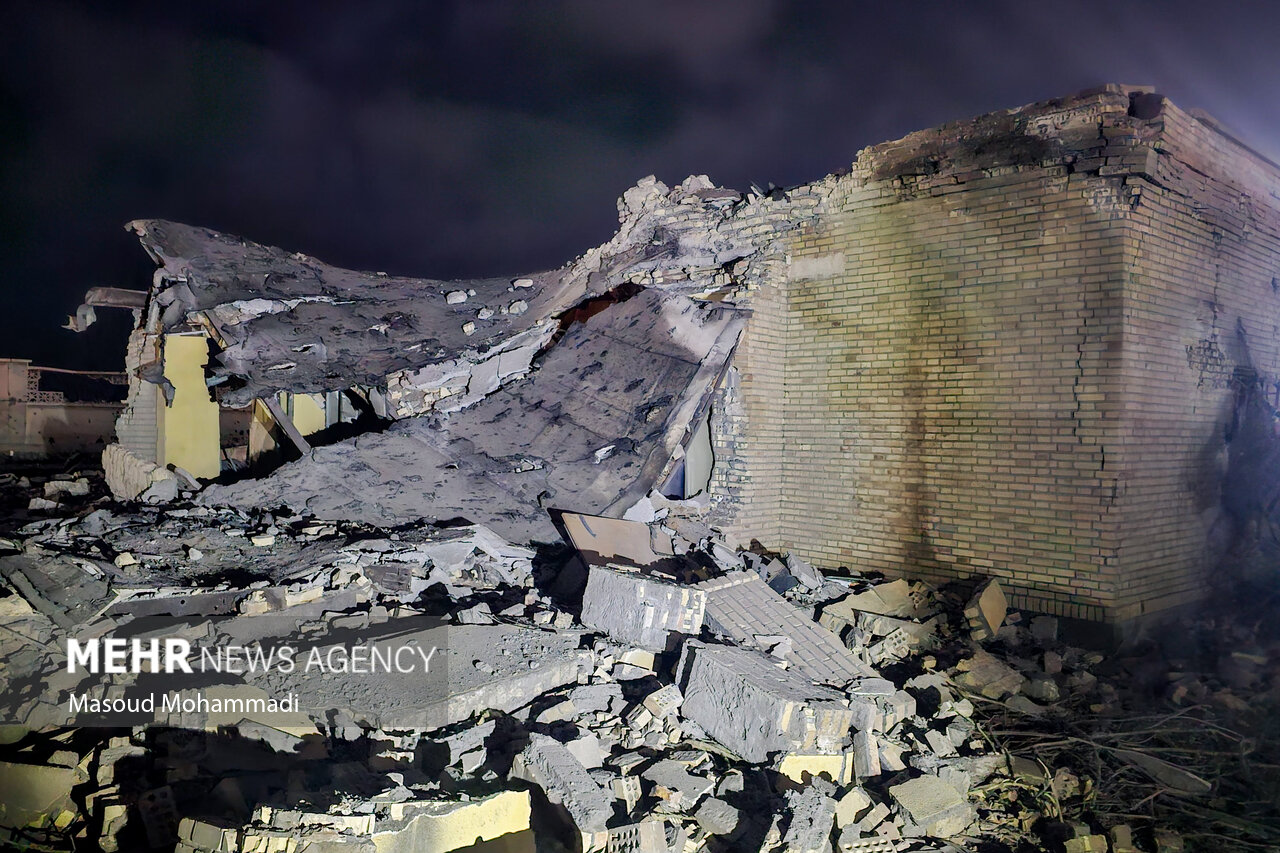
- Aftermath of the airstrike

- Location: 26.8029346°N 57.02500694°E; Kuhestak, Hormozgan province, Iran
- Date: 1 September 2026; 9:30 p.m. IRST (UTC+03:30)
- Target: Wedding party (per Iran)
- Deaths: 5 (including 2 children)
- Injuries: 63 (per Iran); 67 (per IRCS)
- Perpetrator: United States Armed Forces

On 1 September 2026, the United States Armed Forces launched a military strike against targets in the city of Kuhestak, Hormozgan province in southern Iran. Four people at a home in which a wedding celebration was taking place were killed and more than 60 were injured in the attack, one of whom died later in hospital. Shortly after, the Islamic Revolutionary Guard Corps fired several missiles and drones at American military installations in Jordan and Kuwait.

== Background ==
On 1 September 2026, the United States launched new strikes against targets in Iran. According to the US Central Command, the strikes targeted IRGC positions. A home near Sirik where a wedding celebration was being held was hit in the US attacks.

== Attack ==
Around 9:30 p.m. IRST on 1 September 2026, the United States targeted locations in Kuhestak, a town in Sirik County. A home in which a wedding celebration was taking place was hit, killing five people and injuring at least 63. According to Iranian officials, two of the dead were children, and a number of the injured were women and children. One of the children who survived the attack said he heard the sound of fighter jets before the explosion.

According to an Iranian state television reporter, three missiles struck the house where the women's wedding celebration was being held. One of the missiles went through the roof and left a 1.5-metre (4.9 ft) hole in the ground.

A telecommunications tower about 140 metres (460 ft) west of the wedding location was also struck in the attack.

The Daily Telegraph named the dead as Zardkhatun Taheri (50), Kolsoum Fallahi-Molla (43), and two boys who were near the telecommunications tower, Amir Mohammad Karimi (4) and Mohammad Mallahi (16). A 22-year-old woman who had been injured, Asieh Molaeinejad, later died in a hospital two days later. The bride's mother and the wedding couple were not badly injured, as they weren't in the area at the time of the attacks. Rescue efforts continued to about 3:00 am local time. A man named Ali Mallahi, who owned the building where the women's wedding celebration was taking place, told state television that all the people inside were civilians.

== Weapon type ==
Based on missile debris found in the area shown by Iranian state TV, weapons experts, including N.R. Jenzen-Jones, believe the attack was carried out using an AGM-84H/K SLAM-ER missile, one of the most precise cruise missiles made by Boeing for the US military.

Jenzen-Jones further stated that the fragments shown by Iranian media suggest the strike may have used a US-made air-delivered guided weapon. He first thought it was a SLAM-ER cruise missile, but later said a JSOW guided bomb was more likely, while noting multiple weapons may have been used. US Central Command declined to comment.

According to Reuters, four military weapons experts who reviewed videos and images of the incident assessed that the explosion was likely caused by a US munition striking the site directly, rather than by a munition that had struck or ricocheted from another target. Three of the experts also said that the munition was most likely a US weapon, rather than an Iranian air defense missile. Gareth Collett, one of the weapons experts, also believed that some of the remnants shown by Iranian media after the strikes belonged to a Joint Standoff Weapon (JSOW), a type of glide bomb used by the US military.

== Reactions ==
=== Domestic reactions ===
"The United States' catalogue of atrocities against the nation of Iran is now complete," Esmail Baghaei, a spokesman for the Iranian Foreign Ministry, wrote in a post on his X account immediately after the US attack: "Tonight, a residential house in Kohstak, Sirik, was brutally attacked while families were celebrating a wedding. More than 50 innocent men, women and children were martyred or injured." He added that this latest "cruelty" was neither separate from the previous US "the chain of atrocities" in the cities of Minab and Lamerd, as well as Qeshm Island, "nor from the strikes on military targets that were dressed in deceptive justifications." He criticized the silence of governments and international institutions in the face of these attacks, warning that silence in the face of such actions is not neutrality and only emboldens the perpetrators.

Mohammad Bagher Ghalibaf, Iran's top negotiator, called the United States "THE Great Satan" in response to the attack on the wedding in Kuhestak. "If a power acts like Satan, picks targets like Satan, and kills like Satan, it’s Satan. Shields a junior Satan that does the same? It’s THE Great Satan," he wrote in a post on X. He also referred to the US attack on the Minab school.

Iran Red Crescent urged ICC probe into deadly US strike on wedding party. In a letter to the court, the humanitarian group said the attack warrants "an independent, impartial, thorough, and effective investigation" given the "civilian character of the location".

==== Military reaction ====
Following this airstrike, the Islamic Revolutionary Guard Corps Aerospace Force targeted the American Marine Corps barracks in Jordan, known as Camp Titin, with ballistic missiles. According to the Iranian armed forces, a heavy ballistic missile attack was also carried out on the RQ4 and MQ9 drone hangar at Prince Hassan base, destroying a number of drones and killing a number of pilots and flight crew members of the hangar. The United States, Kuwait and Jordan reported no damages or casualties.

=== US reaction ===
On 3 September, US Vice President JD Vance was asked at a White House press conference whether the United States was responsible for the attack on a wedding ceremony in southern Iran. He said he was "extremely skeptical of this" and that the "United States never targets civilians in combat ... unfortunately, obviously, sometimes things happen."

== Legal actions by Iran ==
The Iranian Red Crescent said the attack could be a war crime and, in a letter to the prosecutor of the International Criminal Court, called for legal action and an independent investigation.

== Analysis ==
According to Stephen Quillen of Al-Jazeera, the US government has historically downplayed or denied involvement in civilian killings during military operations, only to quietly acknowledge them later. Analysts, including Emily Tripp of Airwars, suggest that comments like those made about the Iran wedding strike reflect a tendency to manage such incidents "like a PR crisis" rather than through a proper due process. Tripp emphasizes that civilians are at a disadvantage throughout the process, from the initial harm in poorly planned operations to seeking acknowledgment. She criticizes the instinctive disbelief in vulnerable populations’ claims, noting that this stance has repeatedly been proven false.

== See also ==
- US war crimes in Iran strikes
- 2026 Iran war:
  - 2026 Minab school attack
  - 2026 Lamerd sports hall attack
- Other similar civilian airstrikes conducted by the United States:
  - Mukaradeeb wedding party massacre
  - Haska Meyna wedding party airstrike
