= Abolfazl Shekarchi =

Iranian General

- ابوالفضل شکارچی
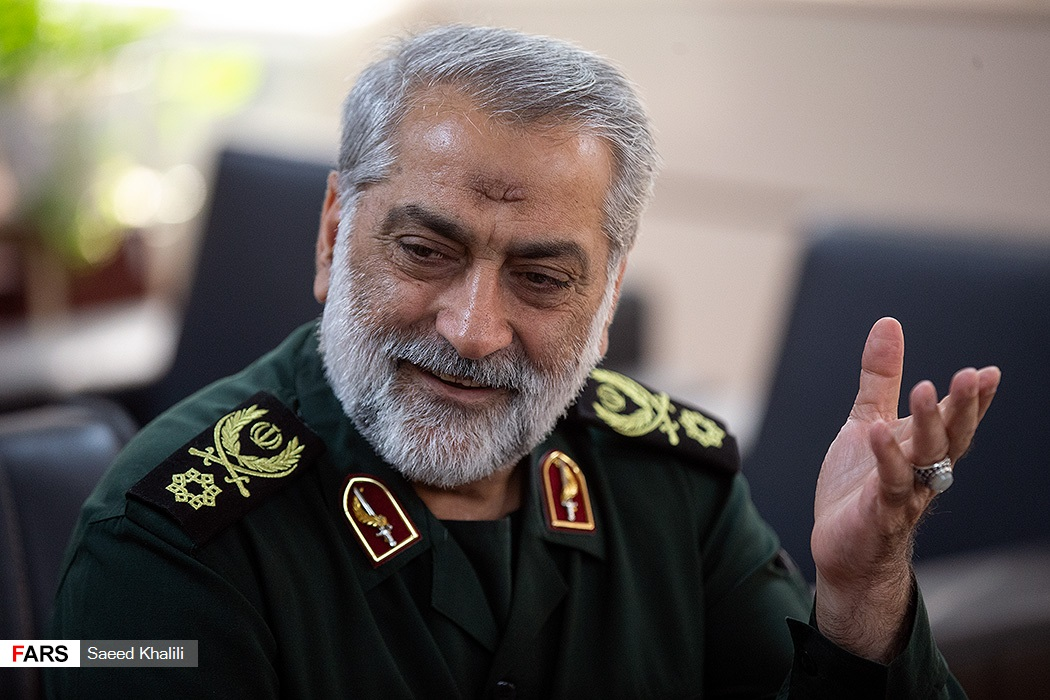

Spokesman of the Islamic Republic of Iran Armed Forces
- Incumbent
- Assumed office 2018
- Preceded by: Masoud Jazayeri

Military service
- Allegiance: Iran
- Years of service: ?-present
- Rank: Brigadier General
- Battles/wars: 2024 Iran–Israel conflict; Twelve-Day War; 2026 Iran war

Abolfazl Shekarchi is an Iranian General and Spokesman of the Iranian Armed Forces.

== History ==
Abolfazl Shekarchi is an Iranian Brigadier General. He has been a key player in the 2024 Iran–Israel conflict and vowed revenge against Israel and the United States of America following the June 2025 Israeli strikes on Iran.
