= 2026 Larak Island attack =

2026 US airstrike on Iranian military targets

- Part of the 2026 Iran war
- Locations within Iran
- Type: Airstrikes
- Location: Larak Island, Iran
- Planned by: United States
- Target: Iranian rocket launchers
- Date: 30 August 2026
- Executed by: United States Air Force
- Casualties: 3 killed Several injured

The 2026 Larak Island attack was carried out by the United States Air Force on 30 August 2026 against two Islamic Revolutionary Guard Corps (IRGC) rocket launchers on Larak Island in southern Iran as part of the 2026 Iran war. It was the first US military action against Iran in more than a month, and prompted an Iranian missile and drone attack on two US-linked bases in Jordan hours later.

== Background ==
By late August 2026, the war between the United States, Israel and Iran had entered its seventh month, with Washington shifting its approach from a bombing campaign toward a financial pressure strategy against Tehran. In the preceding weeks, US officials had said they had established control over the Strait of Hormuz, claiming millions of barrels of oil had passed through the waterway under US military protection despite an Iranian blockade, while Tehran maintained that the strait remained closed. Attacks on shipping in the strait had continued to be reported almost daily.

== Attack ==
According to a US official who spoke to Axios on condition of anonymity, IRGC forces were observed preparing to launch rockets carrying sea mines toward the Strait of Hormuz, prompting US forces to strike two of the group's launchers on Larak Island. Iran's Fars News Agency reported an explosion near Larak Island of unknown cause. US Central Command (CENTCOM) said on X that the US had taken "limited, precise action" to prevent Iranian forces from laying mines in the strait, and blamed Iran for the escalation, denying that the strike constituted an "act of aggression".

The IRGC said the attack killed and wounded several Iranian fighters and civilians, without providing a precise casualty toll, and vowed to respond and "punish those responsible" in a statement carried by Iran's state broadcaster. Fars News Agency said the strike by the "American-Zionist enemy" had killed and injured soldiers, without giving a figure. Tasnim News Agency reported that three were killed in the strike, after one of the several injured died from their injuries.

=== Iranian retaliation ===
Hours after the strike, the IRGC said it had launched a combined missile and drone operation, which it called "Punishment of the Aggressor", against the King Hussein and Al Azraq bases in Jordan, the latter of which hosts US air assets. The IRGC said the operation "destroyed the technical and repair infrastructure, as well as the enemy fighter deployment sites", inflicting significant damage. The Jordanian military said its air defense systems intercepted eight missiles that breached the kingdom's airspace at dawn, and no injuries were reported at either base.

== Reactions ==
The IRGC said "aggression and crimes will not solve the enemy's desperation in attempting to weaken the Islamic Republic's control over the Strait of Hormuz, and every attack will be met with even more devastating responses". US Secretary of Defense Pete Hegseth said the US remained prepared to use military force against Iran if necessary, despite Washington's parallel push to isolate Iran financially through expanded secondary sanctions announced the previous week. Iranian Foreign Minister Abbas Araghchi had separately dismissed reports that the US was able to move large volumes of oil through the strait, writing on X that "our intelligence shows major efforts to game energy markets".

== See also ==
- Economic D-Day
- 2026 Kharg Island attack
- 2026 Lavan Island attack
- 2026 Bubiyan Island raid
