= Kumzari people =

Iranic ethnic group

Kumzari Kumzar
کومزاري
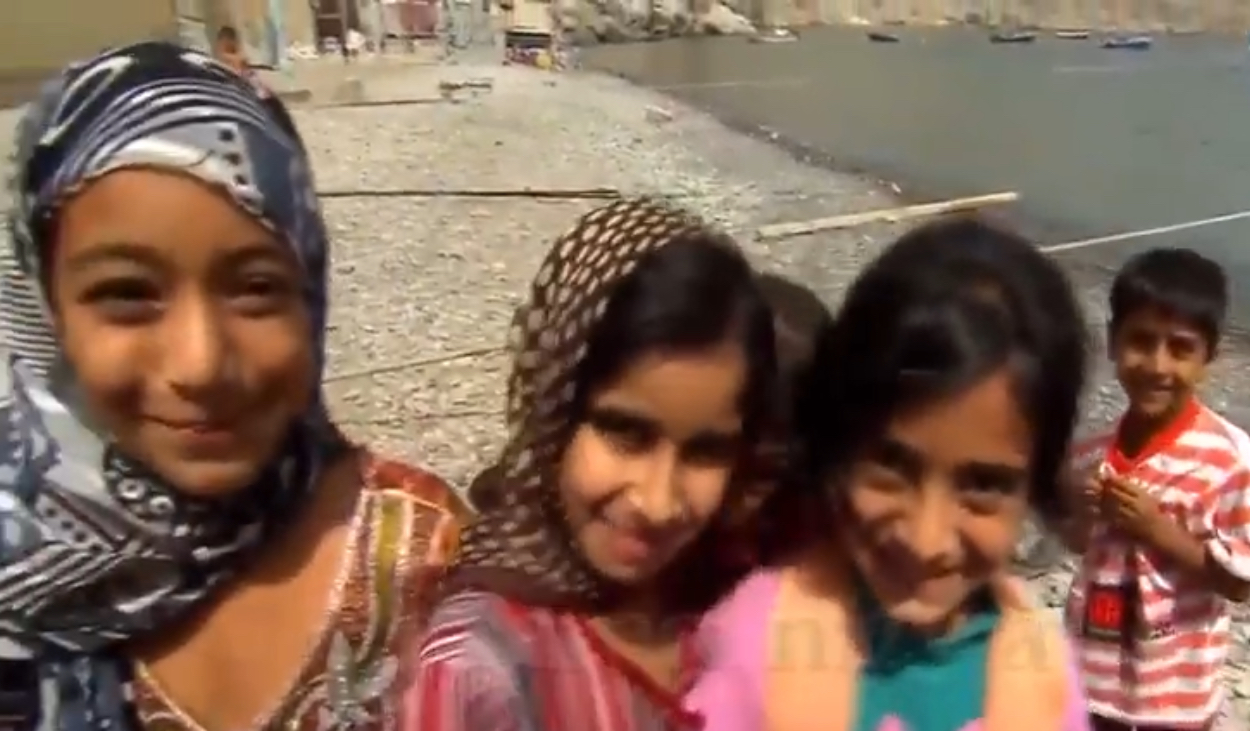
- Kumzari children in Musandam, Oman

Regions with significant populations
- Oman (Kumzar): <5,000
- Iran: 500
- UAE: Unspecified

Languages
- Kumzari, Arabic (Omani, Emirati, Shihhi)

Religion
- Islam

Related ethnic groups
- Lurs, Shihuh

The Kumzari or Kumzar (کومزاري) are an Iranian ethnic group native to the Musandam Peninsula in northern Oman. They speak the Kumzari language along with the Shihuh tribe who are Arabs unlike the Kumzar. They are traditional fisherman.

== History ==
The Kumzari people are said to have been a Persian-related people who travelled to the northern coast of Oman 500 years ago.

Other sources say that the Kumzari originated from the Azd tribe who came to Yemen in the third to fifth centuries AD. The village was ruled by a shaikh who was elected by the Kumzari and Shihuh people of Kumzar. Many Kumzari shaikhs married people outside of their village like Labtiab.

== Traditions ==
Kumzari men perform traditional dances like the Dandana which is a type of dance during Kumzari weddings. They are regarded as semi-nomads and travel to the village of Khasab for trade. They have been regarded as "brave fighters" when it comes to combat.

== Language ==
The Kumzari people have spoken the Kumzari language, which has been designated as an Iranian (Iranic) language, but has a huge Arabic influence as well as Portuguese, English, and Balochi.
