= 2026 Kharg Island attack =

2026 Iran war bombing

- Part of the 2026 Iran war
- U.S. strikes on Kharg Island, 13 March 2026
- Type: Airstrikes
- Location: Kharg Island, Iran; 29.245°N 50.31°E
- Planned by: United States
- Commanded by: Donald Trump
- Target: Military infrastructure
- Date: 13 March 2026; 4 months ago
- Executed by: United States Air Force
- Outcome: 90+ Iranian military sites destroyed
- Location within Iran

On 13 March 2026, the United States Air Force conducted a large bombing raid on Kharg Island, a key oil export hub off the Persian Gulf coast of Iran. The strikes targeted more than 90 Iranian military sites while deliberately avoiding damage to oil and gas infrastructure.

== Background ==
Kharg Island, which is situated in the Persian Gulf and 20 miles (32 km) off the Iranian mainland's coast, is a strategic port and oil export hub, which handles up to 90 percent of Iran's oil exports. The island contains large oil storage facilities which are connected by pipelines to Iran's largest oil and gas fields. The island hosts three main energy infrastructure sites, including Falat Iran Oil Company—which produces 500,000 barrels of crude oil per day—as well as Kharg Petrochemical Company.

The last time that the island was targeted by heavy bombing raids was in the 1980s by Ba'athist Iraq under Saddam Hussein during the Iran–Iraq War. It became a target during the 2026 Iran war that began on 28 February 2026 as a result of joint strikes by the United States and Israel on various Iranian military sites.

Prior to the raid, it was reported that Israel was considering bombing the island, while the United States was favoring the idea of seizing the island. Former Israeli Prime Minister Yair Lapid supported bombing the island, stating "Israel must destroy all of Iran's oil fields and energy industry on Kharg Island; that is what will cripple Iran's economy and topple the regime."

== Assault ==
On 13 March 2026, U.S. President Donald Trump announced that the U.S. military "totally obliterated" military forces on Kharg Island, calling it "one of the most powerful bombing raids in the History of the Middle East" which "totally obliterated every MILITARY target in Iran's crown jewel, Kharg Island," but did not order strikes on its oil infrastructure "for reasons of decency." He did, however, threaten to "immediately reconsider this decision" and strike the oil infrastructure unless Iran ceased its closure of the Strait of Hormuz and stopped attacking vessels there.

United States Central Command stated that a "large-scale precision strike" on Kharg Island targeted more than 90 Iranian military sites and destroyed "naval mine storage facilities, missile storage bunkers, and multiple other military sites." It also asserted that it targeted assets that were being used to block international shipping in the Strait of Hormuz, through which 20 percent of global oil travels.

Iran said that more than 15 explosions were heard on the island although no oil infrastructure was damaged. An oil ministry official reported that the attacks were enormous and destructive and resulted in nearly two hours of nonstop airstrikes and explosions that shook the island. They also warned that an attack on its oil and gas infrastructure would lead to severe economic and infrastructure consequences and hinder much of Iran's oil exports.

Iranian Foreign Minister Abbas Araghchi alleged that the bombing raid on Kharg Island was launched from neighboring countries such as the United Arab Emirates. He claimed that U.S. forces used truck-based M142 HIMARS from the Emirate of Ras Al Khaimah and an area near Dubai.

== Reactions ==
The Islamic Republic of Iran Armed Forces warned that oil and energy infrastructure belonging to firms working with the United States would "immediately be destroyed and turned into a pile of ashes" if oil infrastructure on Kharg Island was targeted. Iranian officials reported that "no military personnel, oil company employees, or island residents suffered casualties in the attack, and all sectors are continuing their routine activities," and that oil companies on the island are continuing to operate without interruption.

Iran threatened to retaliate by targeting multiple ports and cities in the United Arab Emirates from which it claims the United States launched its attack on Kharg Island. The UAE rejected the accusation.

Oil prices consequently increased again after Trump said that U.S. strikes "totally demolished" most of the island and threatened to strike it "a few more times just for fun." While Kharg Island is primarily a maritime port for exporting Iranian crude oil, many supertankers operated by other nations used it to load oil and liquefied petroleum gas at these terminals. Much of the oil shipped from Iran through Kharg Island is exported to China. Iranian oil accounts for 11.6% of China's seaborne imports so far in 2026.

== Aftermath ==
Satellite imagery taken days after the bombing shows that it continues to be used as an export terminal, with three tankers moored there.

There has been speculation of plans to militarily seize the island from Iran, ultimately choking off its oil exports. This speculation has been bolstered by reports of 5,000 U.S. Marines and sailors being sent to the Persian Gulf. A few days later, it was reported that 3,000 paratroopers from the 82nd Airborne Division were being deployed to the Middle East. However, analysts have suggested that this would be a high risk strategy, as it would have a very negative effect on the world's economy, while Iran would still be able to control the Strait of Hormuz.

On 20 March 2026, the US news website Axios reported that Trump was considering blockading or occupying the island in an effort to force Iran to allow ships to pass through the Strait of Hormuz.

Iranian semi-official Fars News Agency reported that the strikes specifically targeted air defences, a naval base, an airport control tower, and a helicopter hangar. A White House official stated to the BBC that "the United States Military can take out Kharg Island at any time," adding that while Trump had no current plans to send troops, "he retains all options as Commander-in-Chief."

== See also ==
- American expansionism under Donald Trump
- 2026 Strait of Hormuz campaign
- Sacrifice for Iran (campaign)
