= Al-Simawi =

13th-century alchemist from Baghdad, Iraq

Abu al-Qasim Ahmad ibn Muhammad al-Iraqi al-Simawi (died 1260?) was a Muslim alchemist from Baghdad who performed various experiments and wrote the Kitāb al-ʿIlm al-muktasab fī zirāʿat al-dhahab ("The Book of Acquired Knowledge concerning the Cultivation of Gold"). Al-Jildaki was deeply inspired by his works and wrote various commentaries and references regarding the works of al-Simawi.
