= Larak Rural District =

Rural district in Hormozgan province, Iran

Larak Rural District Persian: دهستان لارك
- Rural district
- Location within Iran
- Coordinates: 26°51′20″N 56°21′45″E
- Country: Iran
- Province: Hormozgan
- County: Qeshm
- District: Central
- Capital: Larak Shahri

Population (2016)
  - Total: 421
- Time zone: UTC+3:30 (IRST)

Larak Rural District (Persian: دهستان لارك) consists of Larak Island. It is part of the Central District of Qeshm County, Hormozgan province, Iran. Its entire population lives in the village of Larak Shahri.

== Geography ==
The rural district consists of Larak Island in the Strait of Hormuz, south of Hormuz Island; it is about 45 km southeast of Bandar Abbas and 18 km southeast of the eastern end of Qeshm Island. It was part of Shahab District until 2017, when it was reassigned to the Central District.

== Demographics ==
The population of the rural district was counted at 421 in 115 households, all in the village of Larak Shahri, in the 2016 census. The abandoned villages of Larak Kuhi and Mowrona were listed, but with no inhabitants.

The population was 466 in 98 households in the 2006 census, then 473 inhabitants in 109 households in the 2011 census.
