= Kumzari language =

Southwestern Iranian language of Oman and the United Arab Emirates

Kumzari
- Native to: Oman, United Arab Emirates
- Region: Kumzar, Hajar Mountains
- Ethnicity: Kumzar, Shihuh
- Native speakers: 6,000 (2011–2023)
- Language family: Indo-European: Indo-Iranian; Iranian; Western Iranian; Southwestern; Kumzari

Language codes
- ISO 639-3: zum
- Glottolog: kumz1235
- ELP: Kumzari
- The position of Kumzari among Iranian languages. The location is just south of the Persian Gulf in South Iran.

- Kumzari is classified as "severely endangered" by the UNESCO Atlas of the World's Languages in Danger

Kumzari (Persian: کمزاری, Arabic: كمزارية) is a Southwestern Iranian language that has similarities with Persian, Luri, Achomi and Balochi languages. Although vulnerable, it survives today with between 4,000 and 5,000 speakers. It is spoken by the Iranic Kumzari people and the Bedouin Shihuh tribe on the Kumzar coast of the Musandam Peninsula in northern Oman. Kumzari speakers are also found in the towns of Dibba and Khasab as well as various villages on Larak Island in Iran.

Kumzari is the only Iranian language spoken exclusively in the Arabian Peninsula.

== Location ==
The Kumzari name derives from the historically rich mountainous village of Kumzar. The language has two main groups of speakers, one on each side of the Strait of Hormuz: the Shihuh tribe of the Musandam Peninsula and the Laraki community of Larak Island in Iran. On the Musandam Peninsula, the Kumzar population is concentrated in Oman, in the village of Kumzar and in a quarter of Khasab known as the Harat al-Kamazirah. In addition, Kumzari is found at Dibba and the coastal villages of Elphinstone and the Malcolm Inlets. It is the mother tongue of fishermen who are descendants of the Yemeni conqueror of Oman, Malek bin Faham (Arabic: مالك بن فهم). Based on linguistic evidence, Kumzari was present in the Arabia region before the Muslim conquest of the region in the 7th Century A.D.

== Alphabet ==
Kumzari is usually written with the Perso-Arabic script. The Kumzari alphabet has 33 letters: 28 letters from the alphabet, 3 additional letters, the lam-Alif ligature and Hamza.

- ا: الف (alif) – - / ā (no pronunciation or /aː/)
- ب: به (ba) – b (/b/
- پ: په (pa) – p (/p/
- ت: ته (ta) – t (/t/)
- ث: ثه (sa) – s (/s/)
- ج: جيم (jīm) – j (/dʒ/
- چ: چيم (gīm) – g (/g/
- ح: حه (ḥa) – ḥ (/ħ/)
- خ: خه (xa) – x (/χ/)
- د: دال (dāl) – d (/d/)
- ذ: ذال (zāl) – z (/zˠ/)
- ر: ره (ra) – r (/ɻ/)
- ز: زاي (zāy) – z (zˠ)
- س: سين (sīn) – s (/s/)
- ش: شين (šīn): š (/ʃ/)
- ۺ: ۺين (cīn): c (/tʃ/)
- ص: صاد (ṣād) – ṣ (/sˠ/)
- ض: ضاد (ḍād) – ḍ (/dˠ/)
- ط: طا (ṭā): ṭ (/tˠ/)
- ظ: ظا (zā) – z (/zˠ/)
- ع: عين (ʔayn) – ʔ (/ʔ/)
- غ: غين (ǧayn) – ǧ (/ʁ/)
- ف: فه (fa) – f (/f/)
- ق: قاف (qāf) – q (/q/)
- ك: كاف (kāf) – k (/k/)
- ل: لام (lām) – l/ḷ (/l/, /lˠ/)
- م: ميم (mīm) – m (/m/)
- ن: نون (nūn) – n (/n~ŋ/
- ه: هه (ha) – h, a, i, u (/h/, /a/, /i/, /u/
- و: واو (wāw) – w, ū, o (/w/, /uː/, /oː/)
- ي: يه (ya) – y, ī, e (/j/, /iː/, /eː/)
- لا: لام الف (lām alif) – lā (/laː/)
- ء: همزه (hamza) – ʔ (/ʔ/)

Kumzari uses the letter چ, which in Persian represents tʃ, to represent the /g/ sound. This practice is not unique to Kumzari: it is also used to transliterate Hebrew words in the Arabic script for the ג, and also in Lebanon and Greek Aljamiado. The tʃ sound in Kumzari is written ۺ, which is also used in Arabi Malayalam script for the Malayalam ഷ.

Kumzari has 8 vowels: a, ā (/aː/), i, ī (/iː/), u, ū (/uː/), e (/eː/) and o (/oː/). The short vowels a, i and u are written with the 3 harakats Fatḥa, Kasra and Ḍamma, and the long vowels with the 3 harakats followed by ا, ي and و. The long ā vowel at the beginning of a word is written آ. Short vowels a i u at the end of word are written with the 3 diacritics followed by ه. The e and o vowels are written with ي and و without any diacritics.

== Phonology ==
=== Consonants ===
Kumzari has consonants, and all but three (ʔ, ʁ, ɦ) also exist as geminates.

Consonant phonemes
		Labial	Alveolar		Palato- alveolar (Note: van der Wal uses the term alveo-palatal to describe these consonants, using IPA symbols for palato-alveolar consonants rather than alveolo-palatal consonants)	Palatal	Velar	Uvular	Pharyngeal	Glottal
		Labial	plain	velarized	Palato- alveolar	Palatal	Velar	Uvular	Pharyngeal	Glottal
Plosive/ Affricate	voiceless	p	t	tˠ	tʃ		k	q		ʔ
Plosive/ Affricate	voiced	b	d	dˠ	dʒ		g			ʔ
Fricative	voiceless	f	s	sˠ	ʃ			χ	ħ	ɦ
Fricative	voiced			zˠ				ʁ		
Nasal		m	n							
Approximant		w	l ɻ	lˠ		j				

=== Vowels ===
Kumzari has a length distinction in its vowels, with five long vowels and three short vowels. Vowels never occur in direct hiatus; rather, they are separated by either a semivowel such as /j/ or /w/, or a glottal stop (/ʔ/).

Vowels
	Front	Central	Back
Long high	iː		uː
Short near-close	ɪ		ʊ
Long mid	eː		oː
Short near-open		ɐ	
Long low		aː	

== Samples ==
Example Sentences
English	Kumzari	New Persian (Farsi)	Gulf Arabic
Little	كم kam	كم kam	شوي/قليل shwai/qaleel
I go to the sea	می شُم دریه Me-shum deryeh	Standard: می‌شوم دَریا (از فعل شدن به معنای رفتن), romanized: Mi-shavam darya Tehrani/Iranian: میرَم دَریا, romanized: Miram darya Bushehri: میرُم دِریا, romanized: Mirum derya	Modern Standard Arabic: اَذهَبُ الى البَحر, romanized: aadhhabu ela albahr Gulf Arabic (All): اَرُوح اِلبَحَر, romanized: arooh al-bahar
I go to the school	می شُم مدرستو Me-shum madrasto	Standard: می‌روم مدرسه, romanized: Mirawam madraseh Tehrani/Iranian: میرَم مدرسه, romanized: Miram madreseh Bushehri: میرُم دِریا, romanized: Mirum madraseh	Gulf (All): اَرُوح اِلمدرسه, romanized: arooh el-madreseh
I go to the mosque	می شُم مظغث Me-shum mosgeth	Standard: می‌رَوَم مسجد, romanized: Mirawam masjid Tehrani/Iranian: میرَم مسجد, romanized: Miram masjed Bushehri: میرُم مسجد, romanized: Mirum masjid	Gulf (All): اَرُوح المسجد, romanized: arooh el-masjid
Start	یلا گو yalla gow	Standard: شروع کنید, romanized: shoru' konid Tehrani/Iranian: شروع کن, romanized: shoru' kon	MSA: اِبدأ, romanized: eibda'a Gulf (All): اْبدأ, romanized: eibda'a
Put the fan in slow mode	پنکاو سوو یه سلو Pankaw sov ya slow	Standard: پنکه را روی سرعت کم بگذار., romanized: Panke ra rooye sor'at-e kam bogzar Tehrani/Bushehri/Iranian: پنکه رو بذار رو کم, romanized: Panke ro bezar roo kam	MSA: ضع المروحة في الوضع البطيء, romanized: dae almiruhat fi alwade albati' Gulf (Bahraini): خلي/سو البانكه على بطيء/سلو, romanized: Khalli/sow el-bankah ‘ala baṭee’ / slow
