= Larak Island =

Island in the Strait of Hormuz, territory of Iran

Native name: جزیره لارک
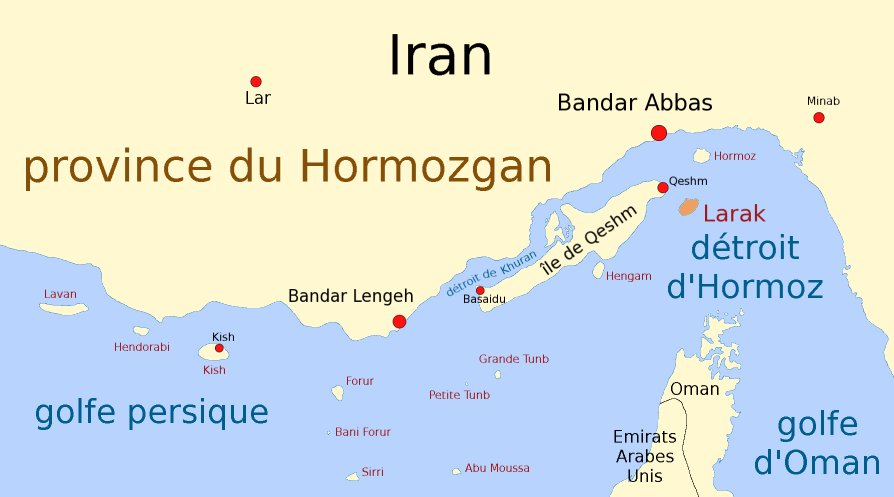

- Location within Persian Gulf Location within Iran

Geography
- Location: Strait of Hormuz
- Coordinates: 26°51′12″N 56°21′20″E
- Adjacent to: Persian Gulf
- Area: 49 km^{2} (19 sq mi)
- Highest elevation: 138 m (453 ft)

Administration
- Iran
- Province: Hormozgan
- County: Qeshm County
- District: Central
- Rural district: Larak Rural District
- Largest settlement: Larak Shahri (pop. 466)
- Jazīreh-ye Lārak North Lighthouse
- Constructed: 2008
- Construction: concrete tower
- Height: 18 m (59 ft)
- Shape: cylindrical tower with balcony and lantern
- Markings: unpainted tower
- Power source: solar power
- Focal height: 40 m (130 ft)
- Range: 18 nmi (33 km; 21 mi)
- Characteristic: Fl(2) W 10s

Larak Island (also Lark Island) is a small Iranian island located off the coast of Bandar Abbas, Iran, east of Qeshm Island and south of Hormuz Island. The narrowest part of the Strait of Hormuz, 24 miles (39 km), lies between this Iranian island and Oman's Great Quoin Island. Larak Island is part of Hormozgan province.

== Geography and demographics ==
Larak Island is a salt plug, with its surface consisting of sandstone, rock salt and iron oxide. It has a number of hills, which rise as high as 138 metres (453 ft).

The island is administered as the Larak Rural District, within the Central District of Qeshm County. The only settlement on the island now is Larak Shahri, on the north-eastern coast. It has a population of 466 people and 98 families. Another settlement, Larak Kuhi, was in the hills in the interior of the island, but was abandoned in the mid-1970s. There have been settlements at Salmi on the west coast and Mowrona on the north-west coast, but they also have been abandoned.

Laraki, a dialect of the Kumzari language, is spoken on Larak Island. Research in 1977 identified that Laraki was the main language in Larak Shahri, while Arabic was spoken in Larak Kuhi.

Laraki-speakers mostly work in fishing, with some goat husbandry, and trade. In the past there was production of dates and barley, and export of salt.

== History ==
During their occupation in the 16th century, during the Portuguese–Safavid wars, the Portuguese built fortresses here, and on the nearby Qeshm and Hormuz Islands.

=== Modern ===
After Iraq attacked Iran's main oil export terminal at Kharg Island in 1985 during the Iran–Iraq War, Iran established new export facilities, including a floating terminal that opened at Larak Island in June 1986. Larak island was bombed by Iraq in November 1986.

Larak has an Iranian military base with several Chinese-made Silkworm HY-2 surface-to-surface missiles placed there in 1987.

In April 1988, during Operation Praying Mantis, the Iranian frigate Sahand was sunk by the United States Navy, 200 meters southwest of Larak Island. On 14 May 1988, the largest ship at the time, the Liberian supertanker, Seawise Giant was sunk by Iraqi anti-ship missiles off the coast of Larak Island while carrying crude Iranian oil. The ship was later refloated, repaired and used for another few years.

In late March during the 2026 Iran war, Iran began routing oil tankers north of Larak Island for a fee ("Tehran's Tollbooth"); distinct from the main channel, this route affords visual inspection of the ships by the IRGC Navy and port authorities. Accordingly Larak Island has been suggested as a military objective.

In August 2026, the US attacked two missile launchers of the Islamic Revolutionary Guard Corps on Larak Island.

== Flora and fauna ==
The island has very little vegetation, with just some low acacia trees, palms, bushes and grasses. It once had a population of wild gazelles. The sea around the island is one of the most diverse coral reef areas in the environment of the Persian Gulf, with 37 species of scleractinian corals identified in the waters.

== See also ==
- 2026 Larak Island attack
- List of lighthouses in Iran
- Bandar Lengeh

== Sources ==
- Anonby, E.; Yousefian, P. (2011). Adaptive Multilinguals: A Survey of Language on Larak Island. Acta Universitatis Upsaliensis. Studia Iranica Upsaliensia 16. Uppsala University. ISBN 978-91-554-8125-4.
