= Tabriz earthquake =

Tabriz earthquake may refer to:

- 1641 Tabriz earthquake, an earthquake near Tabriz, Iran on February 5, 1641
- 1721 Tabriz earthquake, an earthquake near Tabriz, Iran on April 26, 1721
- 1727 Tabriz earthquake, earthquake near Tabriz, Iran on 18 November 1727
- 1780 Tabriz earthquake, earthquake near Tabriz, Iran on 8 January 1780
- 2012 Tabriz earthquakes, a pair of earthquakes near Tabriz, Iran on August 11, 2012

== See also ==
- List of earthquakes in Iran
