= Qeshm earthquake =

Qeshm earthquake may refer to:

- 2005 Qeshm earthquake
- 2008 Qeshm earthquake

== See also ==
- List of earthquakes in Iran
