= Quchan earthquake =

Quchan earthquake may refer to:

- 1893 Quchan earthquake
- 1895 Quchan earthquake

== See also ==
- List of earthquakes in Iran
