= 2022–2023 West Azerbaijan earthquakes =

Earthquakes in Iran

- Location within Iran
- UTC time: 2022-10-05 00:21:29; 2023-01-18 10:08:12; 2023-01-28 18:14:44
- ISC event: 624850002
- USGS-ANSS: ComCat; ComCat; ComCat
- Local date: 5 October 2022; 18 January 2023; 28 January 2023
- Local time: 03:51 (UTC+3:30); 13:38 (UTC+3:30); 21:44 (UTC+3:30)
- Magnitude: 5.6 M_{w}; 5.7 M_{w}; 5.9 M_{w}
- Depth: 15 km (9.3 mi) 17 km (11 mi) 10 km (6.2 mi)
- Epicenter: 38.511°N 45.038°E
- Type: Oblique-reverse
- Areas affected: Iran
- Max. intensity: MMI VIII (Severe)
- Casualties: 3 dead, 3,314 injured (Note: 1,127 injured in the 5 October 2022 event, 252 injured in the 18 January event, three killed and 1,750 injured in the 28 January event, and 185 injured by two events in March.)

Starting on 21 September 2022, and progressing into 2023, an earthquake swarm occurred in the Iranian province of West Azerbaijan, close to the city of Khoy near the Turkish border. Due to mainly three events, a total of 3,880 buildings were destroyed and 52,301 others were damaged in Khoy, including nearly 1,000 schools. Three people died and over 3,310 others were injured, almost all of them due to panic and only a few from collapsed houses.

== Tectonic setting ==
Iran lies within the complicated zone of continental collision between the Arabian and Eurasian plates, which extends from the Zagros fold and thrust belt in the south to the Caucasus Mountains and the Kopet Dag mountains to the north. In northwestern Iran, the Arabian plate is moving at about 20 mm per year relative to the Eurasian plate. Deformation near the city of Tabriz is dominated by the North Tabriz Fault, a WNW-ESE trending right-lateral strike-slip fault, which has been responsible for seven major earthquakes of magnitude 6 or higher since 858 AD. Other known active faults include a W-E trending fault between the cities of Ahar and Heris. This same setting was responsible for a magnitude 6.4 earthquake in August 2012, killing at least 38 and injuring more than 3,200, 268 of which died later in hospitals. In February 2020, two earthquakes caused ten deaths and many injuries in both countries.

== Earthquake sequence ==
The earthquakes occurred near the city of Khoy, and started with a magnitude 5.1 foreshock on September 21. On 5 October, a magnitude 5.6 earthquake hit about 8 km (5.0 mi) southeast of Khoy, at a depth of 15 km. On 18 January 2023, a magnitude 5.7 earthquake struck about 4 km to the southwest. Ten days later, an earthquake with a magnitude of 5.9, struck 2 km to the southwest. The mainshock was also felt in Turkey, Azerbaijan, and Armenia. A magnitude 5.2 aftershock struck on 16 March, followed by a magnitude 5.6 event on 24 March.

== Impact ==
=== 2022 event ===
At least 1,127 people were injured, of whom 135 required treatment. Over 1,100 houses were destroyed and around 10,000 others were damaged in Khoy. However, only one injury was caused by falling debris. In total, two provinces, two cites and 53 villages were affected by the earthquake.

=== 2023 events ===
==== 18 January ====
An additional 252 people received panic-induced injuries. At least 4,420 houses were damaged, of which 570 collapsed or were uninhabitable, and 3,850 others received minor to moderate damage.

==== 28 January ====
Damage more severe than the previous two events occurred, as well as some power outages. The earthquake killed three people. An additional 1,750 were injured, including at least seven in Salmas and three in Chaypareh. Between 20 and 50 percent of houses in 70 villages near the epicentre, as well as over 2,120 others in Khoy collapsed, while 7,500 houses received moderate damage and 30,000 others with slight damage. At least 88 schools were also destroyed and 873 others were damaged.

==== 16 March ====
Some houses were slightly damaged and 20 people were injured.

==== 24 March ====
At least 165 people were injured, two houses collapsed, while 78 others were damaged in ten villages near the epicenter and in Khoy and Salmas. Landslides blocked some roads and power outages occurred in two villages.

== See also ==
- List of earthquakes in 2022
- List of earthquakes in 2023
- List of earthquakes in Iran
- 1930 Salmas earthquake
