= 1977 Bob–Tangol earthquake =

Earthquake sequence in Iran

- Location within Iran
- UTC time: 1977-12-19 23:34:34
- ISC event: 689288
- USGS-ANSS: ComCat
- Local date: December 20, 1977
- Local time: 03:04
- Magnitude: 5.9 M_{w}
- Depth: 22.7 km (14.1 mi)
- Epicenter: 30.95°N 56.50°E
- Fault: Kuh Banan Fault
- Type: Strike-slip
- Areas affected: Iran
- Max. intensity: MMI VII (Very strong)
- Casualties: 584–665 dead, 500–1,000 injured

The 1977 Bob–Tangol earthquake (also known as the Gisk earthquake) struck Kerman province of Iran on December 20, 1977, at 03:04 Iran Standard Time (December 19 at 23:34 UTC). The earthquake measured M_{w} 5.9 and struck at a depth of 22.7 km (14.1 mi). A maximum Modified Mercalli intensity of VII (Very strong) was evaluated based on damage. It had a strike-slip focal mechanism, which was unusual as the source structure was a thrust fault. It was part of a sequence of strong earthquakes along the 400 km (250 mi) Kuh Banan Fault. Between 584 and 665 people perished while a further 500–1,000 were injured; thousands were also made homeless. Casualties from the earthquake was considered moderate due to the sparsely populated area it affected. Preceded by foreshocks the month before, many residents became wary of a larger earthquake and took refuge outside their homes, contributing to the moderate death toll. However, there were none immediately before the mainshock so many were still in their homes when it struck. Aftershocks were felt for several months, some causing additional damage.

== Tectonic setting ==
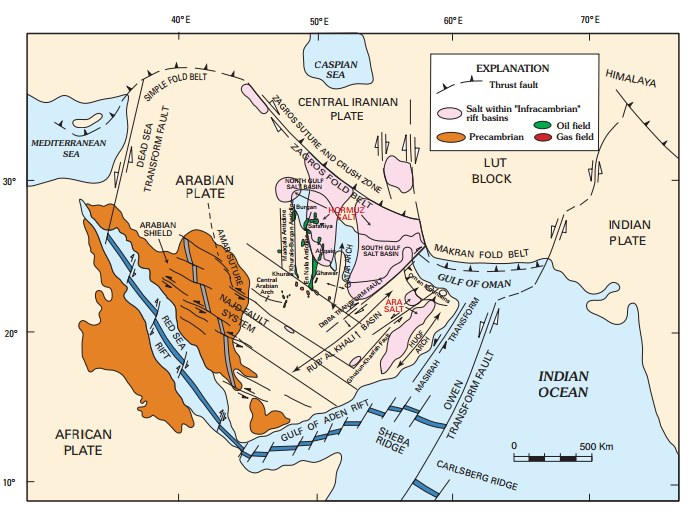
The tectonic setting of Iran and surrounding area

The Iranian plateau is a broad zone of deformed continental crust as it is wedged between the Arabian and Eurasian plates. The Arabian plate, located southeast of the plateau, undergoes oblique convergence with the Eurasian plate in the northeast at a rate of 22 cm (8.7 in) annually. Deformation of the crust is distributed non-uniformly by the fold and thrust belts of the Zagros, Alborz, and Kopet Dag; oceanic lithosphere subduction along the Makran Trench; and strike-slip and reverse faulting within the plateau. The Iranian plateau itself is divided into rigid tectonic blocks. These crustal blocks are aseismic, but at their boundaries, seismicity is high.

== Earthquake ==
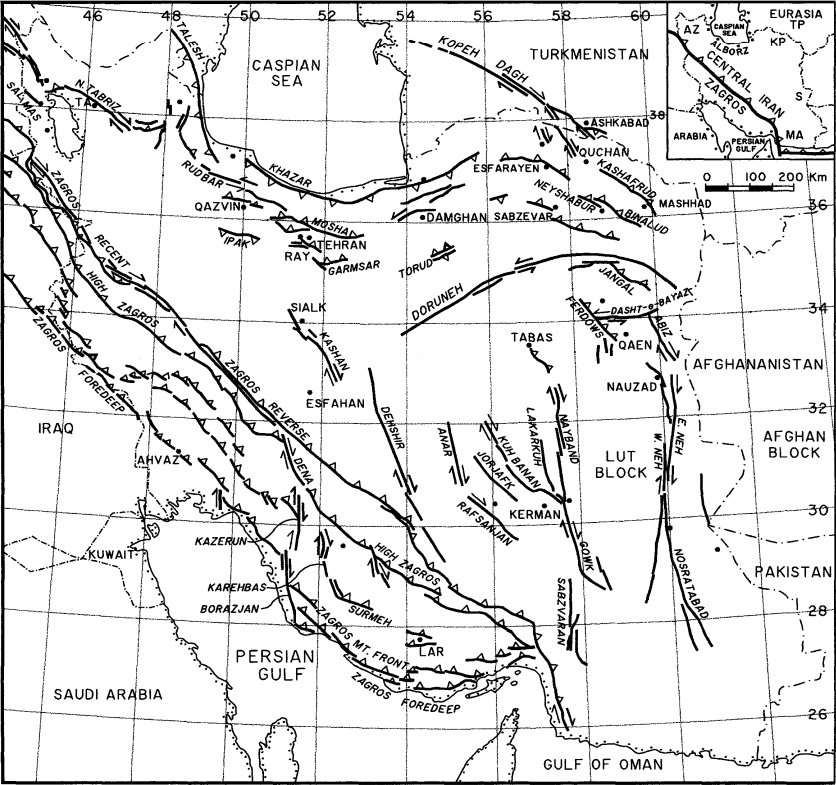
A map of major faults in Iran. The fault that produced the December 19, 1977 earthquake is labelled in the center of the frame

The northeastern boundary of the Zarand plain is well-expressed by a northwest–southeast range front. This also lies the Kuh Banan Fault (KBF), a steep, east-dipping thrust fault measuring 300 km (190 mi) in length and strikes northwest–southeast. It caused the uplift of late Precambrian and Lower Paleozoic rocks over younger Quaternary alluvium. The fault showed active thrusting in the early Quaternary. The eastern side of the KBF is the mountainous range front which is likely the result of the uplift it caused. The KBF is part of a north–south to northwest–southeast striking system of right-lateral faults. These faults accommodate less than 5 mm (0.20 in)/yr of right-lateral deformation between central Iran and the Lut desert.

Seismic activity was first detected along the KBF on September 17 when a strong earthquake shook the region. Two shocks were felt on October 15 and November 7. The foreshock on November 9 damaged several villages. Two additional shocks occurred on November 10 and 13, respectively. No earthquakes were felt from November 13 to the day of the mainshock. Seismicity progressed southwards with the occurrence of the mainshock. The November 9 foreshock may have increased stress in the mainshock zone. Aftershocks were felt until April 2, 1978. The aftershocks which occurred within four months of the mainshock were restricted to the Bob–Tangol segment of the KBF. A strong aftershock on December 24 frightened residents and caused further damage. Seismicity on the KBF progressed northwest to Behabad, five months later, where a damaging earthquake struck on May 24, 1978. That earthquake also had a foreshock sequence which started two days before.

=== Mechanism ===
The mainshock was associated with dextral strike-slip faulting caused by rupturing the Bob–Tangol segment. A focal mechanism analysis displayed a minor thrust component, but was not observed during field research. There were no significant vertical ground displacements along the rupture zone. A 19.5 km (12.1 mi) surface rupture and maximum slip of 20 cm (7.9 in) was measured. This strike-slip mechanism is unusual because it differs from the type of faulting associated with the fault that was responsible, indicating an evolvement in slip vector. Earlier surveys of the fault before the earthquake did not display any strike-slip movement.

=== Strong ground motion ===
The damaging effects of the earthquake were restricted to an area measuring 45 km (28 mi) by 70 km (43 mi) (the meizoseismal area). Structures in the damage area were left in an extremely unsafe and dilapidated state. High-frequency and low amplitude shaking was inferred in the meizoseismal area. The shaking was insufficient in noticeably displacing objects on the ground. A Modified Mercalli intensity of VII (Very strong) was assessed at Dartangal, Gisk and Sarbagh, a 15 km (9.3 mi) zone along the rupture where damage was the greatest. Adobe buildings on bedrock near the rupture were damaged but not destroyed. It was evaluated that ground motion was extreme but of short duration—had it lasted longer, these weakened buildings would have been destroyed. Similarly constructed homes located further southeast on the Zarand plain were razed. This pattern of damage was likely due to the different types of ground or construction.

== Impact ==
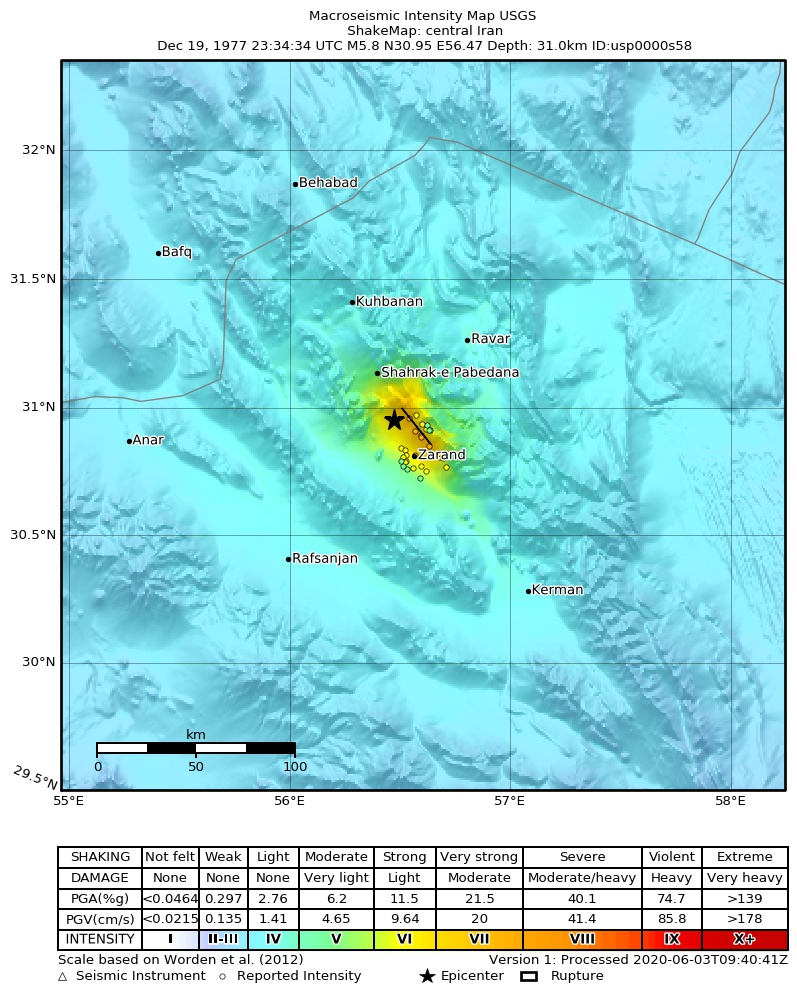
A strong ground motion map by the USGS

Between 584 and 665 people were killed, and up to 1,000 more were injured. The death toll was considered "moderate" as the mainshock only affected a sparsely populated area. In addition, the foreshock on November 9 made residents take refuge in tents. The foreshock damaged and weakened homes in Dehzu village. There were no precursor seismic activity immediately before the mainshock, which would have alerted residents to flee their homes. Many residents were asleep in their stone or mud homes when the earthquake struck. The town of Zarand and four nearby settlements were heavily affected. Thousands were reported homeless. It was the third destructive earthquake to affect Iran that year—an earthquake in March caused 167 deaths and another in April killed 352 people.

Many homes in the affected communities were double storey and had vaulted roofs. Very few intact homes could be repaired. The village of Gisk, home to 2,000 inhabitants, was levelled. The thick masonry walls of homes experienced lateral spreading, allowing roofs to collapse. At least 175 people died in Gisk. In Dartangal, a village of 400 families, many homes were razed and 382 people perished. At Sarbagh, 90 of its 200 residents were killed. Nearly every home in the village was flattened or sustained irrecoverable damage. Shaking was so strong that people were tossed to the ground.

In Zarand, 16 people were killed or seriously hurt. About 250 homes were seriously damaged, and to another 900, damage was minor. Modern infrastructures were mostly unaffected. Damage to these structures, including a nearby power station, were non-structural and superficial. At Aqai, 12 homes were destroyed and two people died. Nearly all 45 homes in Dehzuiyeh were damaged and some roof collapses occurred—one fatality was reported.

== Aftermath ==
A spokesman for the Red Lion and Sun Society, a relief organization, said there were many casualties in the villages of Bab-Tanqal, Ghisak and Sarabagh, where the total population was 5,000. Many survivors lacked access to drinking water and were suffering from cold temperatures. Wet weather forecasted in the days after the disaster was anticipated to make rescue attempts challenging.

Early reports of the death toll varied; the Red Lion and Sun Society said 80 bodies were recovered while government officials said that 343 were killed, citing rescuers. Rescuers said that the death toll could rise as they inspected levelled villages. Armed forces were instructed to assist in rescue operations. Soldiers and rescue workers used kerosene lamps to assist in night time rescue efforts as they comb the debris. The homeless sought refuge at campsites. The air force transported doctors, medical essentials, meals and tents. Several hundred helicopters were conveyed from a base in Isfahan. Injured survivors were taken onboard trains and helicopters to Kerman and Zarand for medical attention. When hospitals were overwhelmed, inhabitants of the cities invited survivors into their homes.

== See also ==
- List of earthquakes in 1977
- List of earthquakes in Iran
