= Bizim Kand =

Bizim Kand (our village) is a TV series in Azerbaijani languages produced and broadcast by Sahand TV in Tabriz, Iran. At each episode the presenter, Moharam Mohammadzadeh, goes to one of the villages in Iranian Azerbaijan region and present the daily life and the problems that the villagers are facing with. The TV show got more attention after its special emotional episode for East Azerbaijan earthquake on 2012.
