= 2005 Qeshm earthquake =

Earthquake in Iran

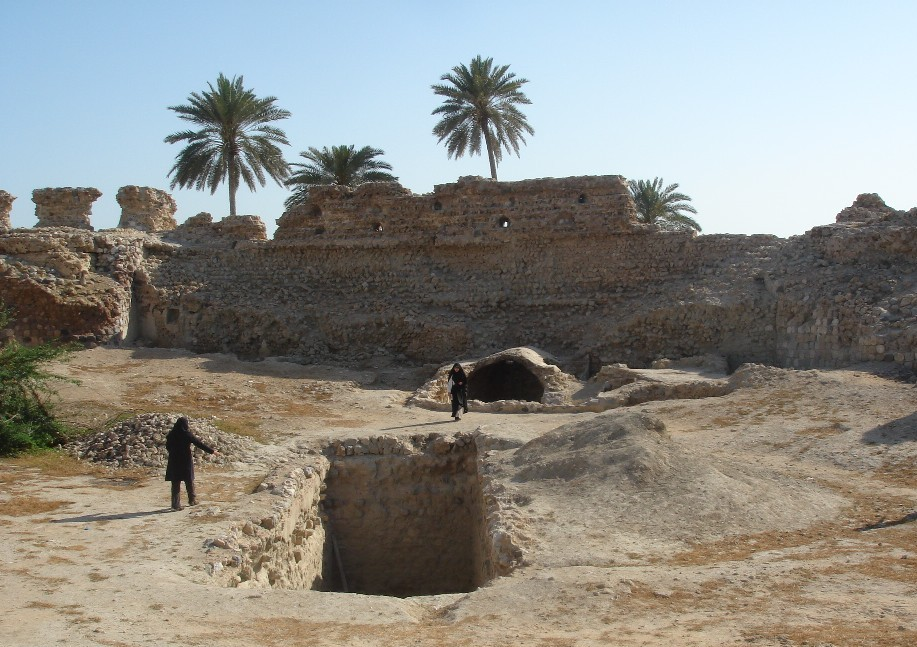
- The Portuguese fortress in Qeshm was damaged in the earthquake.
- UTC time: 2005-11-27 10:22:17
- ISC event: 8461669
- USGS-ANSS: ComCat
- Local date: November 27, 2005
- Local time: 13:52 IRST
- Magnitude: 6.0 M_{w}
- Depth: 10 km (6 mi)
- Epicenter: 26.84°N 55.93°E
- Type: Reverse
- Areas affected: Iran, United Arab Emirates
- Max. intensity: MMI VII (Very strong)
- Tsunami: No
- Casualties: 13 dead, 100 injured

An earthquake occurred on November 27, 2005, at 13:52 IRST (10:22 UTC) on the sparsely populated Qeshm Island off Southern Iran, killing 13 people and devastating 13 villages. It was Iran's second major earthquake of 2005, following the one at Zarand in February. The epicenter was about 1,500 kilometers (930 mi) south of Tehran, close to Iran's southern borders. Initial measurements showed that the earthquake registered about 6.0 on the moment magnitude scale, although that was reduced to 5.8 after further analysis. More than 400 minor aftershocks followed the main quake, 36 of which were greater than magnitude 2.5. The earthquake occurred in a remote area during the middle of the day, limiting the number of fatalities. Iranian relief efforts were effective and largely adequate, leading the country to decline offers of support from other nations and UNICEF.

Qeshm Island is part of the Simply Folded Belt, the most seismically active part of the Zagros fold and thrust belt. Similar to most earthquakes in the area, the 2005 event resulted from reverse slip faulting. Since it lies in such a seismically active area, there is a high risk of destructive earthquakes in Iran; 1 in 3,000 deaths are attributable to earthquakes. One geophysicist has cited the lack of strict building codes as a serious concern.

== Background ==
Iran experiences at least one minor earthquake per day on average, and the Zagros region is particularly prone to seismic activity. Since 1913, Iran has been hit by more than 160 events stronger than magnitude 5, (Note: The strongest of these earthquakes occurred in Qir in 1972 and Demshar-e Khurgu in 1977, both measuring M_{w} 6.7.) with damaging earthquakes near Qeshm recorded in 1360, 1703, 1884, 1897, 1902, and 1905. The majority of Iranian quakes occur in the upper crust, close to the surface, which means that they are potentially more destructive.

In terms of earthquake protection, Iran was named the "worst offender" in 2004 by Professor Roger Bilham of the University of Colorado at Boulder. Bilham, a geophysicist who specializes in earthquake-related deformation and hazards, blames construction practices for many of the deaths in Iranian earthquakes. Since the start of the 20th century 1 in 3,000 Iranians have died in earthquake-related incidents. The United Nations' Common Country Assessment for Iran states that the greatest damage occurs in rural areas, for which no building code exists. Large cities have a building code that takes account of the seismic hazard, but it is not rigorously followed, despite the susceptibility of three quarters of Iranian major cities to damaging earthquakes. The risk posed by poor engineering is of significant concern to the populace and an impediment to economic development. The 1990 Manjil–Rudbar earthquake, with at least 42,000 fatalities, cost Iran roughly 7.2 percent of its Gross National Product (GNP) for that year, and wiped out two years of economic growth.

== Geological setting ==
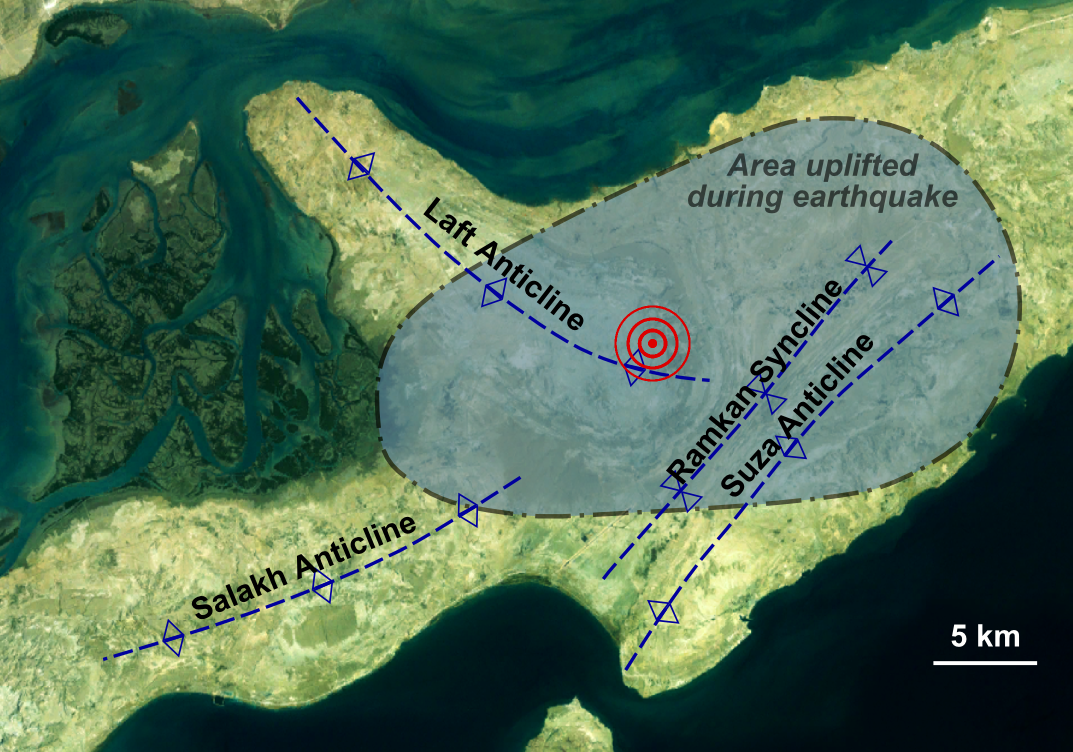
The main fold structures in the central part of Qeshm island, with the epicenter and area uplifted during earthquake

Iran lies within the complex zone of collision between the Arabian plate and the Eurasian plate; near Qeshm the rate of convergence is about 25 millimeters annually. Part of this convergence is accommodated by crustal shortening and thickening within the Zagros fold and thrust belt, with the remainder occurring to the north of the Iranian Plateau. The most active part of the Zagros is the Simply Folded Belt, which is characterised by large folds formed above a layer of late Neoproterozoic to Early Cambrian Hormuz salt, which locally reaches the surface in the crests of some anticlines as salt diapirs. The sequence of sedimentary rocks above the salt layer comprises a basal Cambrian conglomerate beneath a thick sequence of limestones of Palaeozoic to late Cretaceous age, known together as the "Competent Group" owing to their relatively high mechanical strength, overlain by a sequence of weaker marls and interbedded limestones of latest Cretaceous to early Miocene age, topped by Neogene sandstones and conglomerates. There is evidence of intermediate level detachment at some of the weaker layers, which means that folds at different stratigraphic levels may have different locations, orientations, or wavelengths. Measurements of earthquake focal mechanisms and hypocentral depths show that shortening is accommodated by a mixture of high-angle and low-angle reverse faulting, within either the lowest part of the sedimentary cover or in the basement beneath the Hormuz salt.

The island of Qeshm is elongated WSW–ENE, parallel to the coastline and the regional trend of the main fold axes. Neogene sedimentary rocks outcrop at the surface over the whole island, apart from a diapir of older Hormuz salt that pierces through to the surface at its western end. The sediments are affected by a series of large, mainly anticlinal folds that show a variety of trends in the central part of the island. The axis of the Laft anticline runs mainly NW–SE, while the Salakh anticline trends roughly W–E and the Suza anticline and Ramkan syncline trend SW–NE. The island shows clear evidence of recent uplift in the form of marine terraces, with the highest terrace identified at 220 meters (720 ft) above sea level. An uplift rate of 0.2 millimeters annually has been estimated from uranium series dating (^{230}Th/^{234}U) of aragonite from corals on the terraces.

== Characteristics ==
The earthquake was initially measured at 6.0 on the moment magnitude scale, although later analysis suggests a slightly lower value of 5.8. The epicenter was near the village of Gavarzin in central Qeshm, and a hypocentral depth of 10 kilometers (6 mi) was estimated. The focal mechanism derived for the earthquake indicates that it was the result of reverse faulting on a fault plane dipping either to the north at 50° or to the south-southeast at 40°. No evidence has been found of surface faulting, but a 3-kilometer-long (2 mi) set of bedding-parallel cracks was observed on the northwestern flank of the Ramkan syncline, interpreted as representing probable slip along bedding planes, possibly due to further tightening of this fold. Other NW–SE trending tensional cracks observed further southwest along the syncline are more likely to be due to salt movement at depth.

Surface displacement during the earthquake was measured using SAR interferometry. The computed area of uplift is elongated W-E, with a maximum value of about 20 centimeters (8 in) centered over the eastern end of the Latif anticline. A smaller area of subsidence was observed to the south of the uplifted area, and the lack of a sharp boundary between the two suggests that the fault does not come to the surface. The pattern of displacement is consistent with a north-dipping fault rupturing between about 8 kilometers (5 mi) and 4 kilometers (2 mi) in depth, which also provides a good match to the results of seismic modeling using body waves, although a SSE-dipping plane remains possible. This depth range strongly suggests that the fault affected the lower part of the sedimentary cover, while not ruling out some basement involvement. The mismatch between the orientation of the fault planes that caused the earthquake and the observed surface folds suggests that deformation at these two levels is decoupled by the presence of a detachment, possibly within marl layers.

Most aftershocks occurred at significantly greater depths than the mainshock and are dominated by strike-slip focal mechanisms. This suggests that the mainshock triggered later movement on a complex set of right and left lateral strike-slip faults within the basement, together accommodating north-south shortening beneath the Hormuz salt layer.

On September 10, 2008, there was another major earthquake on Qeshm, with a magnitude of 5.9 and hypocentral depth of 8 kilometers (5 mi). The pattern of uplift observed for this earthquake is also consistent with rupturing within the lower sedimentary sequence, but on a fault with two segments, dipping overall to the southeast. The earthquakes of 2005 and 2008 may have ruptured adjacent segments of the same southeast-dipping reverse fault. Seven deaths were reported as a result of the 2008 earthquake.

== Damage and casualties ==
The earthquake hit at 13:52:19 IRST, or 1:52 pm (10:22:19 UTC), and lasted between 10 and 30 seconds. It killed 13 people and injured 100 on Qeshm Island. In Zirang (Ziranag), a village on Qeshm, 80 percent of the buildings were demolished. Seven villages experienced extensive damage, and 13 villages were destroyed: Tonban, Ramekan, Gevarzin, Khaledin, Direstan, Kushe, Karavan, Turyan, Tom senati, Gorbehdan, Ziranag, Giahdan, and Gourian. There were reports of intensity III effects on the Mercalli scale from Bandar Abbas, Abu Dhabi, Ajman, Dubai, Fujairah and Ras al-Khaimah; Intensity IV (Light) effects occurred at Sharjah. (Note: The Mercalli intensity scale measures the intensity of earthquakes, mainly by the damage they cause and their effect on the surrounding area.) Shaking from the earthquake was also noted in Oman. No major damage occurred directly at the epicenter; residents of Qeshm reported that the shaking smashed windows, leading citizens to evacuate their homes fearing collapse. In total more than 2,000 people were affected.

One major hospital damaged by the earthquake was inundated with the injured and lacked medical supplies for treatment. An airport on the epicentral island sustained damage, and power lines on the island were severed. The director of Tehran's seismological building dismissed fears of a tsunami, saying that the Persian Gulf was not deep enough to allow for one. In one school, some people suffered broken legs when the building collapsed, but there were no fatalities. Buildings in Dubai, including the Emirates Towers, were evacuated because of concerns that the structures might collapse, but no such incidents occurred. One woman described the locals as "panicked". Television stations throughout Iran released footage of quake damage and of injured residents being taken to hospitals.

A landslide and 36 major aftershocks of more than magnitude 2.5 (in total, 400 aftershocks) followed the earthquake. A former Portuguese fortress, built by Admiral Afonso de Albuquerque in 1507, sustained heavy damage to its eastern wall but otherwise remained intact.

If the earthquake had occurred during the early morning while residents were asleep, rather than mid-afternoon (1:52 pm local time), it could have been deadlier as housing in the epicentral area consisted chiefly of mud and brick.

== Relief efforts and aftermath ==
Aid workers from the domestic region began delivering supplies such as food, blankets, and tents. (Note: Around 74,151 tins of tuna fish, 40,920 kilograms (90,210 lb) of rice, 46,700 tins of canned beans, 10,445 kilograms (23,027 lb) of sugar, 16,836 kilograms (37,117 lb) of edible oil, 5,986 kilograms (13,197 lb) of pulse, and 1,133 kilograms (2,498 lb) of tea were distributed by the Iranian Red Crescent Society (IRCS). The organization also gave out 4,696 sets of relief tents, 5,677 sets of moquettes, 10,689 sets of blankets, 2,169 kitchen sets, 1,477 ovens, 1,250 sets of lanterns and 4,001 cartons of hygienic kits.) A dispatch of 101 relief helpers, 40 IRCS staff, and four people from the public relations department at ReliefWeb also assisted survivors. Three ambulances, 46 trucks, three helicopters, 12 vans, nine cars, two minibuses, and two sniffer dogs were also dispatched to help citizens of quake-struck areas.

Injured residents were transported to Bandar Abbas by helicopter. An Iranian police official, citing concerns about possible looting, said all movement into and out of damaged houses would require prior approval from the governor's office, the police, and the Unexpected Events Committee on the island. UNICEF offered assistance to Iran, and the official in charge of response stated: "we are preparing to respond if needed". They elaborated that the Iranian authorities "appeared to have things under control".

In 2007, the Asian Centre on Seismic Risk Reduction was formed in response to the regular earthquakes experienced in south, west, and central Asia, to "encourage regional and inter-regional networking and partnerships to reduce seismic damage". Earthquakes account for 73 percent of natural disaster deaths in these locations.

== See also ==
- List of earthquakes in 2005
- List of earthquakes in Iran
