= Zirang =

Zirang زيرانگ
- Village
- Location within Iran
- Coordinates: 26°51′18″N 56°03′31″E
- Country: Iran
- Province: Hormozgan
- County: Qeshm
- Bakhsh: Shahab
- Rural District: Suza

Population (2006)
  - Total: 1,048
- Time zone: UTC+3:30 (IRST)
  - Summer (DST): UTC+4:30 (IRDT)

Zirang (Persian: زيرانگ, also Romanized as Zīrāng and Zīrānag) is a village in Suza Rural District, Shahab District, Qeshm County, Hormozgan Province, Iran. At the 2006 census, its population was 1,048, in 191 families. The village suffered heavily in the 2005 Qeshm earthquake.
