= Tomsenati =

Tomsenati تم سنتي
- Village
- Location within Iran
- Coordinates: 26°52′28″N 56°00′15″E
- Country: Iran
- Province: Hormozgan
- County: Qeshm
- Bakhsh: Central
- Rural District: Ramkan

Population (2006)
  - Total: 227
- Time zone: UTC+3:30 (IRST)
  - Summer (DST): UTC+4:30 (IRDT)

Tomsenati (Persian: تم سنتي, also Romanized as Tomsenatī) is a village in Ramkan Rural District, in the Central District of Qeshm County, Hormozgan Province, Iran. At the 2006 census, its population was 227, in 38 families. The village suffered heavily in the 2005 Qeshm earthquake.
