= Kovarzin =

Kovarzin کورزین
- village
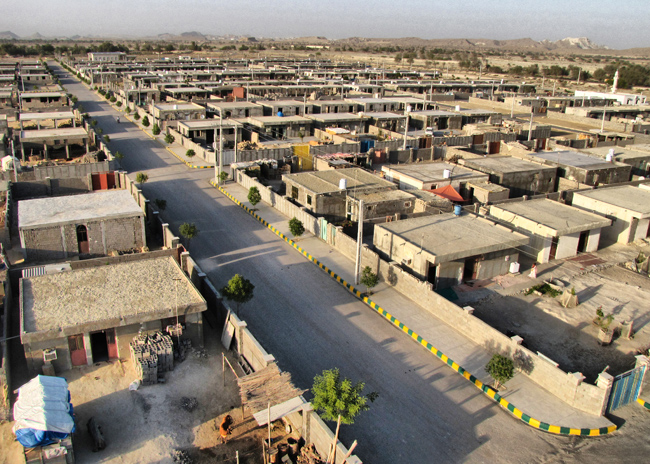
- Gevarzin, new village part

- Location within Iran
- Coordinates: 26°47′41.6″N 55°50′1.7″E
- Country: Iran
- Province: Hormozgan
- County: Qeshm
- Bakhsh: Central
- Rural District: Howmeh

Population (2006)
  - Total: 1,360
- Time zone: UTC+3:30 (IRST)
  - Summer (DST): UTC+4:30 (IRDT)

Kovarzin (Persian: کورزین, also Romanized as Kovarzīn ; also known as Kavarzīn and Kuvardīn) is a village in Howmeh Rural District, in the Central District of Qeshm County, Hormozgan Province, Iran. At the 2006 census, its population was 1,360, in 342 families. The village suffered heavily in the 2005 Qeshm earthquake.
