= 2008 Qeshm earthquake =

Magnitude 5.9 earthquake in southern Iran

- Location within Iran
- UTC time: 2008-09-10 11:00:34
- ISC event: 13393964
- USGS-ANSS: ComCat
- Local date: 10 September 2008
- Local time: 06:30
- Magnitude: 5.9 M_{w}
- Depth: 8 km (5.0 mi)
- Epicenter: 26.743°N 55.828°E
- Type: Oblique-slip
- Areas affected: Iran
- Max. intensity: MMI VIII (Severe)
- Casualties: 7 dead, 45 injured

The 2008 Qeshm earthquake occurred on 10 September in the Hormozgān Province of southern Iran, 850 kilometres (528 mi) south of Tehran. Its epicenter was near the port city of Bandar Abbas, where an earthquake two years prior had caused damage. The earthquake measured 5.9 on the moment magnitude scale and 6 on the surface wave scale, killing seven people and injuring up to 45. Causing both catastrophic and minor damage, the earthquake devastated up to 200 villages throughout southern Iran, but left the port city of Bandar Abbas almost unscathed. Citizens reportedly panicked when the earthquake hit, emptying into the parks of the city and other open areas.

== Geological setting ==
Iran lies within the complex zone of collision between the Arabian plate and the Eurasian plate; near Qeshm the rate of convergence is about 25 millimeters annually. Part of this convergence is accommodated by shortening within the Zagros fold and thrust belt, with the remainder occurring to the north of the Iranian Plateau. The most active part of the Zagros is the 'Simply Folded Belt', which is characterised by large folds formed above a layer of late Neoproterozoic to Early Cambrian Hormuz salt, which locally reaches the surface in the crests of some anticlines as salt diapirs. The sedimentary rocks above the salt layer comprise a basal Cambrian conglomerate and a thick sequence of limestones of Palaeozoic to Upper Cretaceous age, known together as the 'Competent Group' due to their relatively high competence, followed by a sequence of mechanically weaker marls and interbedded limestones of latest Cretaceous to Lower Miocene age topped by Neogene sandstones and conglomerates. There is evidence of intermediate level detachment at some of the weaker layers, leading to folds at different stratigraphic levels have different locations, orientations or wavelengths. Earthquake focal mechanisms and hypocentral depths show that shortening is accommodated by a mixture of high-angle and low-angle reverse faulting, within either the lowest part of the sedimentary cover or in the basement beneath the Hormuz salt.

The island of Qeshm is elongated WSW–ENE, parallel to the coastline and the regional trend of the main fold axes. It is formed of Neogene sediments apart from a diapir of Hormuz salt that pierces through to the surface at the western end of the island. The sediments are affected by a series of large, mainly anticlinal folds that show a variety of trends in the central part of the island. The axis of the Laft anticline runs mainly NW–SE, while the Salakh anticline trends roughly W–E and the Suza anticline and Ramkan syncline trend SW–NE. The island shows clear evidence of recent uplift in the form of marine terraces, with the highest terrace identified at 220 meters (720 ft) above sea level. An uplift rate of 0.2 millimeters annually has been estimated from Uranium series dating of aragonite from corals on the terraces.

== Earthquake ==
The earthquake had a magnitude of 5.9 on the moment magnitude scale, making it the largest in the region since 2005. The hypocentral depth is estimated as 8 km from body wave modelling. The calculated focal mechanism indicates reverse faulting with a small component of strike-slip, on two possible fault planes, either dipping 43° to the north or 52° to the southeast.

Uplift associated with the earthquake has been measured using SAR interferometry. The results are consistent with a fault that did not reach the surface. A simple fault plane model with a width of 12.8 km dipping to the southeast makes a reasonable match with the observed uplift pattern. However, the best fit to both the results from body wave modelling and SAR interferometry comes from a model with two contiguous fault segments, one to the northeast with a strike of 025°, and the other to the southwest with a strike of 065°, both with an overall southeasterly dip. It has been suggested that this earthquake and the 2005 Qeshm event may have ruptured adjacent parts of the same fault.

== Damage and casualties ==
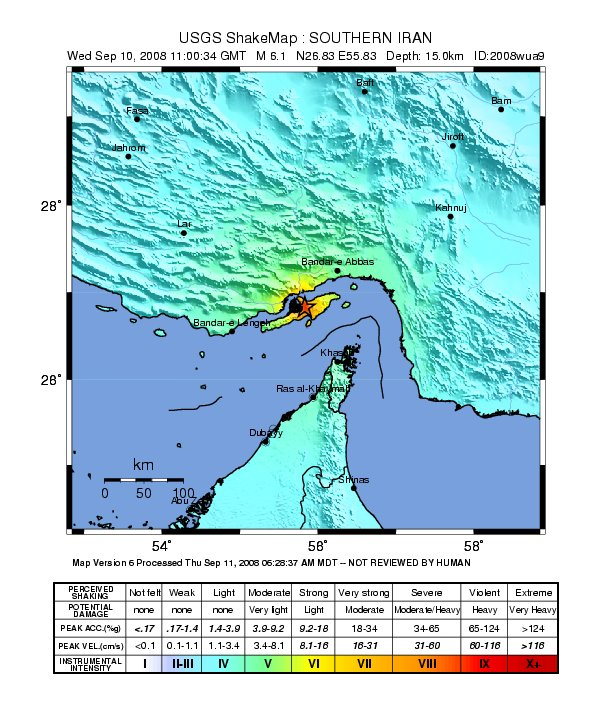
USGS ShakeMap for the event

The earthquake occurred at 3:00 pm local time and was followed by up to seventeen aftershocks. The main shock lasted at least 30 seconds. According to the BBC, fatalities from the tremor were limited to Qeshm Island; 30 people were injured. Qeshm Island reported 15 injured; its homes were constructed from earthquake-resistant material. The earthquake was felt throughout southern Iran, causing slight to moderate damage. Mercalli ratings of IV (Light) were assigned to Ajman and Ra's al Khaymah, and intensity III (Weak) occurred in Abu Dhabi, Dubai, and Sharjah. Doha in Qatar also reported the earthquake.

Though major locations held up well against the earthquake, most villages did not. From Qeshm Island came reports of power outage and minor damage; 100 houses in all of Qeshm were damaged between 30 and 50 percent. Two-hundred villages were devastated by the earthquake's velocity. Walls in the village of Zeynabi were leveled; all were reduced by the earthquake to debris. Relief workers were sent to rescue any residents from their homes if they had been caught under debris.

The earthquake posed a threat to all of Bandar Abbas' oil companies, as well as at least one highly productive and expensive refinery at the time of the earthquake. Because of past earthquakes, including one in 2006, many of the city's homes had been rebuilt and outfitted with seismically engineered designs. The major oil refinery did not sustain damage, according to Hojjatollah Ghanimifard, the vice-president of investment affairs for National Iranian Oil Company.

The effects were concentrated on Qeshm, where several buildings were destroyed, although minor damage was reported around Bandar Abbas. All of the seven reported deaths occurred on Qeshm, with the injured being transferred to Bandar Abbas by boat. There were no reports of damage to oil industry facilities in the area. High-rise buildings in Dubai swayed during the earthquake, causing some of them to be evacuated, but there were no reports of damage.

== Future threats ==
As the world's worst in a 2004 report on countries with poor earthquake engineering, Iran is especially prone to earthquakes. In addition, poor construction practice has exacerbated death tolls; 1 in 3,000 Iranians has died in an earthquake-related incident. Roger Bilham, a professor at the University of Colorado declared that "Most of Iran needs rebuilding. If the population of Iran had a choice between spending oil revenues on munitions or houses that won't kill them, I suspect they would choose a safe home. It's all a matter of earthquake education." The United Nations developed a Common Country Assessment for Iran, stating, "While adequate building regulations exist for large cities, it is generally believed that they are not rigorously adhered to... most of those who have suffered in recent major earthquakes have lived in small towns and villages. Earthquake-proof construction is very rare in those areas and adequate building regulations are not yet in place".

== See also ==
- List of earthquakes in 2008
- List of earthquakes in Iran
