= Iranian Earthquake Engineering Association =

Iranian research association

The Iranian Earthquake Engineering Association (IEEA) is an organization established in 1993 under the auspices of the Iranian Scientific Associations commissions. It seeks to promote, expand, and improve Iranian research, training, and education in the fields of earthquake engineering and seismology. The IEEA's membership comprises more than 900 researchers, practicing professionals, educators, government officials, and building code regulators. The IEEA's main activity has concentrated on the training of engineers in the retrofitting of structures, publishing the newsletter, and giving lectures.

== See also ==
- List of earthquakes in Iran
