= 1780 Tabriz earthquake =

Earthquake in Iran

- Location within Iran
- Local date: January 8, 1780
- Local time: 01:15
- Magnitude: 7.4 M_{s}
- Depth: 20 km (12 mi)
- Epicenter: 38.2°N 46.0°E
- Fault: North Tabriz Fault
- Max. intensity: MMI IX (Violent)
- Foreshocks: yes
- Casualties: 50,000 fatalities (estimate)

The 1780 Tabriz earthquake occurred at 01:15 local time on 8 January. It had an estimated magnitude of 7.4 and a maximum felt intensity of IX on the Mercalli intensity scale. The city of Tabriz was almost completely destroyed. The number of reported casualties varies from 40,000 to as many as 200,000, with 50,000 being a more likely estimate.

== Tectonic setting ==
Tabriz lies within the complex zone of collision between the Arabian plate and the Eurasian plate. The main structures accommodating this oblique collision are west–east trending thrust faults and WNW-ESE trending dextral (right lateral) strike-slip faults. The North Tabriz Fault is an active 150 km long dextral strike-slip fault that passes close to the northern edge of Tabriz city. It has two main segments and an estimated overall slip rate of about 7 mm per year. The southeastern segment is interpreted to have ruptured in the 1721 Tabriz earthquake, while the northwestern segment ruptured during the 1780 earthquake. Both events produced associated ground rupture, which is still observable. An average slip of about 4 m has been estimated for earthquakes along the northwestern segment. A recurrence interval of about 800 years has been estimated, suggesting that a major earthquake along this structure is unlikely in the next few centuries, although a recurrence interval of 250–300 years has also been proposed, indicating that there is potential for a major earthquake in the relatively near future.

== Earthquake ==
The earthquake sequence started with a strong foreshock. The mainshock was felt over a large area, including at Divrigi over 700 km away. Aftershocks continued for several years, the most damaging being on 12 and 20 February. The observed surface fault break extended for 60 km. There is evidence of some vertical movement in addition to the horizontal displacement.

== Damage ==
All buildings within the city of Tabriz were reported destroyed and similar levels of damage affected many villages in the neighbouring area. The degree of destruction may in part relate to the weakening effects of the 1721 earthquake, which also caused severe damage to the city.
