= Gorbah Dan =

Gorbah Dan گربه دان
- Village
- Location within Iran
- Coordinates: 26°51′43″N 55°58′56″E
- Country: Iran
- Province: Hormozgan
- County: Qeshm
- Bakhsh: Central
- Rural District: Ramkan

Population (2006)
  - Total: 810
- Time zone: UTC+3:30 (IRST)
  - Summer (DST): UTC+4:30 (IRDT)

Gorbah Dan (Persian: گربه دان, also Romanized as Gorbah Dān, Gorbahedān, and Gorbehdān) is a village in Ramkan Rural District, in the Central District of Qeshm County, Hormozgan Province, Iran. At the 2006 census, its population was 810, in 154 families. The village suffered heavily in the 2005 Qeshm earthquake.
