= Giahdan =

Giahdan گياهدان
- Village
- Location within Iran
- Coordinates: 26°54′58″N 56°03′49″E
- Country: Iran
- Province: Hormozgan
- County: Qeshm
- Bakhsh: Central
- Rural District: Howmeh

Population (2006)
  - Total: 2,416
- Time zone: UTC+3:30 (IRST)
  - Summer (DST): UTC+4:30 (IRDT)

Giahdan (Persian: گياهدان, also Romanized as Gīāhdān and Geyāhdān; also known as Giadūn) is a village in Howmeh Rural District, in the Central District of Qeshm County, Hormozgan Province, Iran. At the 2006 census, its population was 2,416, in 507 families. The village suffered heavily in the 2005 Qeshm earthquake.
