= List of earthquakes in 1977 =

Earthquakes in 1977
Approximate epicenters of the earthquakes in 1977
- 4.0–5.9 magnitude
- 6.0–6.9 magnitude
- 7.0–7.9 magnitude
- 8.0+ magnitude
- Strongest: Indonesia, south of Sumbawa (Magnitude 8.3) August 19
- Deadliest: Romania, Vrancea County (Magnitude 7.5) March 4 1,641 deaths
- Total fatalities: 3,107

Number by magnitude
- 9.0+: 0
- 8.0–8.9: 1
- 7.0–7.9: 10
- 6.0–6.9: 75
- 5.0–5.9: 1,693
- 4.0–4.9: 2,395

This is a list of earthquakes in 1977. Only earthquakes of magnitude 6 or above are included, unless they result in damage and/or casualties, or are notable for some other reason. Events in remote areas will not be listed but included in statistics and maps. Countries are entered on the lists in order of their status in this particular year. All dates are listed according to UTC time. Maximum intensities are indicated on the Mercalli intensity scale and are sourced from United States Geological Survey (USGS) ShakeMap data. Not a particularly busy year as far as the number of magnitude 7.0+ events with 11 being recorded. The largest event struck Indonesia in August and measured magnitude 8.3. The Solomon Islands were affected by a series of magnitude 7.5 events in April. Several events caused significant numbers of fatalities especially in Iran which had 3 earthquakes throughout the year with a combined death toll of around 1,120 people. The deadliest earthquake occurred in Romania in March and was the worst in the country's history. 1,641 people were killed in this event.

== By death toll ==
Rank	Death toll	Magnitude	Location	MMI	Depth (km)	Date
1	1,641	7.5	Romania, Vrancea County	VIII (Severe)	94.0	March 4
2	584	5.8	Iran, Kerman Province	VIII (Severe)	31.0	December 19
3	366	5.9	Iran, Chaharmahal and Bakhtiari Province	IX (Violent)	41.0	April 6
4	189	8.3	Indonesia, south of Sumbawa	VI (Strong)	25.0	August 19
5	167	6.9	Iran, Hormozgan Province	IX (Violent)	29.0	March 21
6	70	7.4	Argentina, San Juan Province, Argentina	X (Extreme)	13.0	November 23
7	34	6.7	British Solomon Islands, Guadalcanal	VII (Very strong)	33.0	April 20
8	30	5.2	Turkey, Elazığ Province	V (Moderate)	21.0	March 25
9	18	7.5	British Solomon Islands, Guadalcanal	VII (Very strong)	33.0	April 21

Listed are earthquakes with at least 10 dead.

== By magnitude ==
Rank	Magnitude	Death toll	Location	MMI	Depth (km)	Date
1	8.3	189	Indonesia, south of Sumbawa	VI (Strong)	25.0	August 19
2	7.6	0	Western Samoa	VI (Strong)	33.0	April 2
= 3	7.5	1,641	Romania, Vrancea County	VIII (Severe)	94.0	March 4
= 3	7.5	0	British Solomon Islands, Guadalcanal	VII (Very strong)	19.0	April 20
= 3	7.5	0	British Solomon Islands, Guadalcanal	VII (Very strong)	33.0	April 20
= 3	7.5	18	British Solomon Islands, Guadalcanal	VII (Very strong)	33.0	April 21
4	7.4	70	Argentina, San Juan Province, Argentina	X (Extreme)	13.0	November 23
= 5	7.2	0	British Solomon Islands	VI (Strong)	33.0	July 29
= 5	7.2	0	Tonga, south of	III (Weak)	33.0	October 10
6	7.1	0	Falkland Islands Dependencies, east of South Georgia and the South Sandwich Islands	( )	33.0	August 26
7	7.0	1	Philippines, Luzon	VIII (Severe)	37.0	March 18

Listed are earthquakes with at least 7.0 magnitude.

== By month ==
=== January ===
January
- Strongest: 6.6 M_{w} Papua New Guinea
- Total fatalities: 0

Number by magnitude
- 8.0–8.9: 0
- 7.0–7.9: 0
- 6.0–6.9: 7
- 5.0–5.9: 131
- 4.0–4.9: 184

Date	Country and location	M_{w}	Depth (km)	MMI	Notes	Casualties	
Date	Country and location	M_{w}	Depth (km)	MMI	Notes	Dead	Injured
1	China, Qinghai Province	6.3	27.0	VII			
2	Indonesia, south of Sumbawa	6.3	19.0	V			
6	Papua New Guinea, off the north coast of East Sepik Province	6.6	33.0	VII			
17	Chile, Antofagasta Region	6.3	33.0	VI			
18	New Zealand, Cook Strait	6.0	50.0	VI			
26	Indonesia, Bali	5.2	33.0	VI	Some damage was caused.		
31	Soviet Union, Batken Region, Kyrgyzstan	6.1	20.0	VII	Some damage was caused.		

=== February ===
February
- Strongest: 6.7 M_{w} United States
- Total fatalities: 0

Number by magnitude
- 8.0–8.9: 0
- 7.0–7.9: 0
- 6.0–6.9: 7
- 5.0–5.9: 96
- 4.0–4.9: 152

Date	Country and location	M_{w}	Depth (km)	MMI	Notes	Casualties	
Date	Country and location	M_{w}	Depth (km)	MMI	Notes	Dead	Injured
4	Argentina, Salta Province	6.0	549.0				
19	United States, Near Islands, Alaska	6.7	33.0				

=== March ===
March
- Strongest: 7.5 M_{w} Romania
- Deadliest: 7.5 M_{w} Romania; 1,641 deaths
- Total fatalities: 1,839

Number by magnitude
- 8.0–8.9: 0
- 7.0–7.9: 2
- 6.0–6.9: 7
- 5.0–5.9: 132
- 4.0–4.9: 229

Date	Country and location	M_{w}	Depth (km)	MMI	Notes	Casualties	
Date	Country and location	M_{w}	Depth (km)	MMI	Notes	Dead	Injured
2	Philippines, Moro Gulf, Mindanao	6.1	52.0	VI			
4	Romania, Vrancea County	7.5	94.0	VIII	Deadliest event of 1977. The 1977 Vrancea earthquake caused major destruction despite being fairly deep. 1,641 people were killed and 10,500 were injured. This was the deadliest earthquake in Romanian history. Bucharest suffered major property damage with costs reaching $2 billion (1977 rate).	1,641	10,500
8	Indonesia, northern Sumatra	6.0	22.0	VIII	Some damage was caused.		
18	Philippines, Luzon	7.0	37.0	VIII	1 person was killed and another 9 were injured. 14 homes were destroyed and 22 more were damaged. Costs were $100,000 (1977 rate).	1	9
21	Iran, Hormozgan Province	6.9	29.0	VIII	During the 1977 Khurgu earthquake, 167 people were killed and another 556 were injured. Major damage was reported.	167	556
23	Fiji	6.3	33.0	VI			
23	Fiji	6.0	2.0		Aftershock of previous event.		
25	Turkey, Elazığ Province	5.2	21.0	V	30 people were killed and major damage was caused.	30	
26	United States, Fox Islands (Alaska)	6.0	38.0	IV			

=== April ===
April
- Strongest: 7.6 M_{w} Western Samoa
- Deadliest: 5.9 M_{w} Iran; 366 deaths
- Total fatalities: 418

Number by magnitude
- 8.0–8.9: 0
- 7.0–7.9: 4
- 6.0–6.9: 7
- 5.0–5.9: 156
- 4.0–4.9: 234

Date	Country and location	M_{w}	Depth (km)	MMI	Notes	Casualties	
Date	Country and location	M_{w}	Depth (km)	MMI	Notes	Dead	Injured
1	Iran, Hormozgan Province	6.2	29.0	VII	Aftershock of March 21 event.		
2	Western Samoa	7.6	33.0	VI	Some damage was reported.		
6	Iran, Chaharmahal and Bakhtiari Province	5.9	41.0	IX	The 1977 Naghan earthquake killed at least 366 people and left a further 200 injured. Some damage was caused.	366	200
20	United Kingdom, Guadalcanal, Solomon Islands	6.7	33.0	VII	Beginning of a series of large and destructive earthquakes in a period of several hours. 12 people died and a further 22 were missing in the first event. Major damage was caused. A mild tsunami was observed.	34	
20	United Kingdom, Guadalcanal, Solomon Islands	7.5	19.0	IX	Some damage was caused.		
20	United Kingdom, Guadalcanal, Solomon Islands	7.5	33.0	VIII	Suspected injuries and damage were reported.		1+
21	United Kingdom, Guadalcanal, Solomon Islands	6.1	33.0	VI			
21	United Kingdom, Guadalcanal, Solomon Islands	7.5	33.0	VII	Final of the mainshocks in the series. A further 18 people were killed and 1 person was injured. Major damage was caused.	18	1
21	United Kingdom, Solomon Islands	6.0	33.0	V	Aftershock.		
22	United Kingdom, Solomon Islands	6.0	51.0	V	Aftershock.		

=== May ===
May
- Strongest: 6.0 M_{w} United States
- Deadliest: 5.4 M_{w} Iran; 3 deaths
- Total fatalities: 3

Number by magnitude
- 8.0–8.9: 0
- 7.0–7.9: 0
- 6.0–6.9: 1
- 5.0–5.9: 128
- 4.0–4.9: 211

Date	Country and location	M_{w}	Depth (km)	MMI	Notes	Casualties	
Date	Country and location	M_{w}	Depth (km)	MMI	Notes	Dead	Injured
26	Iran, West Azarbaijan Province	5.4	37.0	V	3 people were killed and 9 were injured. Heavy damage was reported.	3	9
30	United States, Fox Islands (Alaska)	6.0	33.0	IV			

=== June ===
June
- Strongest: 6.8 M_{w} Tonga
- Deadliest: 6.8 M_{w} Tonga; 1 death
- Total fatalities: 1

Number by magnitude
- 8.0–8.9: 0
- 7.0–7.9: 0
- 6.0–6.9: 4
- 5.0–5.9: 115
- 4.0–4.9: 224

Date	Country and location	M_{w}	Depth (km)	MMI	Notes	Casualties	
Date	Country and location	M_{w}	Depth (km)	MMI	Notes	Dead	Injured
22	Tonga	6.8	65.0	VII	1 person was killed and 5 were injured in the 1977 Tonga earthquake. $1.2 million (1977 rate) of property damage was caused.	1	5

=== July ===
July
- Strongest: 7.2 M_{w} United Kingdom, Solomon Islands
- Total fatalities: 0

Number by magnitude
- 8.0–8.9: 0
- 7.0–7.9: 1
- 6.0–6.9: 5
- 5.0–5.9: 116
- 4.0–4.9: 184

Date	Country and location	M_{w}	Depth (km)	MMI	Notes	Casualties	
Date	Country and location	M_{w}	Depth (km)	MMI	Notes	Dead	Injured
16	Yugoslavia, Upper Carniola, Slovenia	4.6	6.0	VI	Some damage was caused.		
21	Philippines, Luzon	6.9	33.0	VII			
29	United Kingdom, Solomon Islands	7.2	33.0	VI			

=== August ===
August
- Strongest: 8.3 M_{w} Indonesia
- Deadliest: 8.3 M_{w} Indonesia; 189 deaths
- Total fatalities: 192

Number by magnitude
- 8.0–8.9: 1
- 7.0–7.9: 1
- 6.0–6.9: 11
- 5.0–5.9: 180
- 4.0–4.9: 212

Date	Country and location	M_{w}	Depth (km)	MMI	Notes	Casualties	
Date	Country and location	M_{w}	Depth (km)	MMI	Notes	Dead	Injured
19	Indonesia, south of Sumbawa	6.1	33.0		Foreshock of 1977 Sumba earthquake.		
19	Indonesia, south of Sumbawa	8.3	25.0	VI	Largest event of 1977. The 1977 Sumba earthquake caused some damage. A large tsunami led to 189 deaths and 75 injuries. Damage costs of $1.2 million (1977 rate). Many aftershocks followed.	189	75
26	United Kingdom, east of South Georgia and the South Sandwich Islands	7.1	33.0				
27	Indonesia, north of Timor	6.8	25.0	VII			
29	Philippines, west of Luzon	6.2	12.0	V			
31	Colombia, Antioquia Department	6.4	33.0	VII	3 people were killed and some damage was caused.	3	

=== September ===
September
- Strongest: 6.6 M_{w} United States
- Total fatalities: 0

Number by magnitude
- 8.0–8.9: 0
- 7.0–7.9: 0
- 6.0–6.9: 9
- 5.0–5.9: 141
- 4.0–4.9: 192

Date	Country and location	M_{w}	Depth (km)	MMI	Notes	Casualties	
Date	Country and location	M_{w}	Depth (km)	MMI	Notes	Dead	Injured
4	New Hebrides, Vanuatu	6.5	33.0	VI			
4	United States, Rat Islands, Alaska	6.4	34.0	II	First of a series of large events in the area.		
4	United States, Rat Islands, Alaska	6.4	31.0	II			
4	United States, Rat Islands, Alaska	6.6	8.0	II			
12	Greece, southwest of Crete	6.0	33.0				
13	Tonga	6.0	33.0				

=== October ===
October
- Strongest: 7.2 M_{w} Tonga
- Total fatalities: 0

Number by magnitude
- 8.0–8.9: 0
- 7.0–7.9: 1
- 6.0–6.9: 4
- 5.0–5.9: 184
- 4.0–4.9: 208

Date	Country and location	M_{w}	Depth (km)	MMI	Notes	Casualties	
Date	Country and location	M_{w}	Depth (km)	MMI	Notes	Dead	Injured
10	Tonga, south of	7.2	33.0	III			
22	Argentina, Santiago del Estero Province	6.1	614.0				

=== November ===
November
- Strongest: 7.4 M_{w} Argentina
- Deadliest: 7.4 M_{w} Argentina; 70 deaths
- Total fatalities: 70

Number by magnitude
- 8.0–8.9: 0
- 7.0–7.9: 1
- 6.0–6.9: 7
- 5.0–5.9: 160
- 4.0–4.9: 186

Date	Country and location	M_{w}	Depth (km)	MMI	Notes	Casualties	
Date	Country and location	M_{w}	Depth (km)	MMI	Notes	Dead	Injured
3	Bulgaria, Pazardzhik Province	5.2	6.0	VII	Some damage was caused.		
4	United States, Andreanof Islands, Alaska	6.7	33.0	VI			
9	Iran, Semnan Province	4.9	33.0	IV	Some damage was caused.		
18	China, western Xizang Province	6.5	33.0	VIII			
23	Argentina, San Juan Province, Argentina	7.4	13.0	X	70 people were killed and 300 were injured in the 1977 San Juan earthquake. Extensive property damage was caused with costs of $80 million (1977 rate).	70	300
23	Argentina, La Rioja Province	6.0	33.0	VI	Aftershock.		
24	Argentina, San Juan Province, Argentina	6.0	33.0	VII	Aftershock.		
24	Argentina, San Juan Province, Argentina	6.3	23.0	VII	Aftershock.		

=== December ===
December
- Strongest: 6.8 M_{w} Japan
- Deadliest: 5.8 M_{w} Iran; 584 deaths
- Total fatalities: 584

Number by magnitude
- 8.0–8.9: 0
- 7.0–7.9: 0
- 6.0–6.9: 6
- 5.0–5.9: 154
- 4.0–4.9: 179

Date	Country and location	M_{w}	Depth (km)	MMI	Notes	Casualties	
Date	Country and location	M_{w}	Depth (km)	MMI	Notes	Dead	Injured
19	Iran, Kerman Province	5.8	31.0	VIII	During the 1977 Bob–Tangol earthquake, 584 people were killed and 1,000 were injured. Major damage was caused.	584	1,000
28	Red Sea	6.6	33.0	VIII			
