= 1977 Sumba earthquake =

Earthquake and tsunami in Indonesia

- Location within Indonesia
- UTC time: 1977-08-19 06:08:55
- ISC event: 694739
- USGS-ANSS: ComCat
- Local date: August 19, 1977
- Local time: 14:08
- Magnitude: 8.3 M_{w}
- Depth: 33 kilometres (21 mi)
- Epicenter: 11.085°S 118.464°E
- Type: Normal
- Areas affected: Indonesia; Australia
- Total damage: US$1.2 million
- Max. intensity: MMI VI (Strong)
- Tsunami: Yes
- Casualties: ~180 killed 1,100+ injured

The 1977 Sumba earthquake (also called the Sumbawa earthquake) occurred approximately 290 kilometres (180 mi) south of Bima, Sumbawa, and beneath the Indian Ocean, at 14:08 local time on 19 August. With a moment magnitude of 8.3, the earthquake is notable for having an unusually great magnitude for a shock with a normal faulting focal mechanism. The shock occurred near the southern section of the Sunda Trench where several other tsunami-generating earthquakes have occurred. The event is considered as the largest outer-rise earthquake in Indonesia to date, with aftershocks extending about 130 kilometres (81 mi) eastward and 110 kilometres (68 mi) westward from the epicenter along the trench.

Although damage from the earthquake was limited to Indonesia, ground movement was reportedly felt as far afield as Albany in Australia, and the power supply was briefly cut in Port Hedland. A tsunami was generated with observed run-up heights of up to 5.8 meters (19 ft) and inundation distances of up to 1,200 metres (3,900 ft) at several locations on Sumba and Sumbawa. The maximum tsunami height recorded was 15 meters above high tide. The combined number of victims from both the earthquake and tsunami in Indonesia was at least 107 confirmed dead and several dozen others missing, presumed dead; several sources combine the two for a total casualty figure of approximately 180 deaths and 1,100 injuries.

== See also ==
- List of earthquakes in 1977
- List of earthquakes in Indonesia
- List of earthquakes in Australia
