= 2019 East Azerbaijan earthquake =

Earthquake in Iran

- Location within Iran
- UTC time: 2019-11-08 22:47:07
- ISC event: 616764888
- USGS-ANSS: ComCat
- Local date: 8 November 2019
- Local time: 03:17 (UTC+4:30)
- Magnitude: 5.9 M_{w}
- Depth: 20 km (12 mi)
- Epicenter: 37.803°N 47.581°E
- Areas affected: Iran
- Max. intensity: MMI VII (Very strong)
- Aftershocks: More than 610, largest is magnitude 4.8
- Casualties: 7 dead, 584 injured

The 2019 East Azerbaijan earthquake occurred at 03:17 local-time on 8 November 2019. This earthquake had a moment magnitude of 5.9 and had a shallow depth of 20 km.

== Tectonic setting ==
Iran lies within the complex zone of continental collision between the Arabian Plate and the Eurasian Plate, which extends from the Bitlis-Zagros belt in the south to the Greater Caucasus Mountains, the Absheron-Balkan Sill and the Kopet Dag mountains in the north. The collision between these plates deforms an area of ~ 3,000,000 km^{2} of continental crust. It is one of the largest convergent deformation regions on Earth. In northwestern Iran, the Arabian Plate is moving northwards at about 20 mm per year relative to the Eurasian Plate, somewhat oblique to the plate boundary zone. The deformation in the area near Tabriz is dominated by the North Tabriz Fault, a WNW–ESE trending right-lateral strike-slip fault, which has been responsible for 7 historical earthquakes of magnitude greater than 6 since AD 858. Other known active faults include a W-E trending fault between the cities of Ahar and Heris. This same setting caused a magnitude 6.4 earthquake in August 2012, killing at least 38 and injured more than 3,200, 268 of which died later in hospitals.

== Earthquake ==
Modified Mercalli intensities in selected locations
MMI	Locations	Population exposure
MMI VII (Very strong)	Sarab	77,000
MMI VI (Strong)	Hashtrud	83,000
MMI V (Moderate)	Tabriz	1.28 million
MMI IV (Light)	Ardabil	6.45 million

The magnitude 5.9 earthquake was a result of strike-slip faulting approximately 250 km to the northeast of the plate boundary between the Arabian Plate and Eurasian Plate plate. The focal mechanism indicated faulting in a left-lateral sense beneath Mount Bozgush. Aftershocks distribution suggest rupture along a NE–SW plane. It is thought to have ruptured along a buried parallel splay branch of the Shalgun–Yelimsi Fault. A fault dimension of 3.8 × 4.9 km^{2} was estimated, buried beneath the surface. It produced a maximum slip of 0.8 meter at 5 km depth, while a large area of slip occurred at between 2 km and 11 km depth.

== Impact ==
=== Damage and casualties ===
Six cities and 145 villages with a combined population of 121,307 were affected by the earthquake, out of which thirty were completely destroyed. The most affected areas in East Azerbaijan Province were the towns of Miyaneh and Sarab. Some livestock were also killed due to the collapse of barns and sheds. The earthquake caused landslides and damaged transportation routes, telecommunication, water sewages, and caused fires due to the damage of gas pipelines. Five people were killed in the earthquake and 66 were injured by falling debris. 518 others were injured due to quake-caused panic, and two others died due to carbon monoxide poisoning from fires caused by the quake.

Moderate shaking was felt in Tabriz, where six houses collapsed and over 400 were damaged.

=== Relief ===
3,091 tents, over 3,000 food parcels, 3,521 blankets, 4,595 bottles of water, 440 kitchen sets and 350 pieces of bread were sent to displaced victims of the earthquake.

== See also ==
- List of earthquakes in 2019
- List of earthquakes in Iran
