= 1895 Quchan earthquake =

Earthquake in Iran

- Location within Iran
- UTC time: 1895-01-17
- Local date: 17 January 1895
- Local time: 11:30
- Magnitude: 6.8 M_{s}
- Epicenter: 37.1°N 58.4°E
- Areas affected: Iran, Quchan County
- Max. intensity: MMI VIII (Severe)
- Casualties: 1,000–11,000

The 1895 Quchan earthquake occurred at about 11:30 local time (08:30 UTC) on 17 January. It had an estimated magnitude of 6.8 on the surface-wave magnitude scale and a maximum perceived intensity of VIII (Severe) on the Mercalli intensity scale. It caused severe damage in Quchan County, particularly to the town of Quchan itself and there were an estimated 1,000–11,000 casualties. It was the last in a sequence of major damaging earthquakes that struck the area between 1851 and 1895.

== Tectonic setting ==
The Kopet Dag mountain range lies at the northern edge of the complex zone of deformation caused by the continuing collision of the Arabian plate with the Eurasian plate. To the west it links with the Caucasus Mountains through the Caspian Sea. There is currently about 3 mm per year of shortening across the Kopet Dag as a whole. The Quchan Fault zone, trending NNW-SSE, is one of a set of active right lateral strike-slip faults that accommodate part of the shortening across the Kopet Dag and extension along its length. It has an estimated displacement rate of about 1.5 mm per year. The damage areas of the sequence of earthquakes that affected the Quchan area between 1851 and 1895 follow the projected path of the Quchan fault and its likely continuation as a thrust fault in the Atrak valley, where it forms a surface anticline.

== Earthquake ==
The 1895 earthquake was preceded by a group of four foreshocks that were felt in Mashhad over a period of three days. The area affected by this earthquake was very similar to that affected by the 1893 shock.

== Damage ==
The town of Quchan, newly rebuilt after the 1893 earthquake, was again devastated by the 1895 shock. The Imamzadeh of Sultan Ibrahim, which survived the earlier earthquake with some damage, collapsed completely. 600 people were trapped in a mosque that collapsed and a similar number were killed in public baths. The houses that had been rebuilt after 1893 were again ruined, but their lighter construction meant that there were far fewer casualties. The foreshocks may also have provided warning.

== Aftermath ==
Initial attempts to move Quchan to a new location following the earthquake caused rioting. Only after the governor was replaced was the town moved about 10 km to the east, although some families refused to leave their farms and rebuilt their houses in the old location. The new site is, however, still within the epicentral area of the 1893 and 1895 earthquakes.

== See also ==
- List of earthquakes in Iran
- List of historical earthquakes
