= 1977 Naghan earthquake =

Severe earthquake centered in Ardabil, northern Iran

- Location within Iran
- UTC time: 1977-04-06 13:36:37
- ISC event: 699473
- USGS-ANSS: ComCat
- Local date: April 6, 1977
- Local time
- Magnitude: 6.0 M_{w}
- Depth: 6 km (3.7 mi)
- Epicenter: 31.845°N 50.711°E
- Type: Reverse
- Areas affected: Iran
- Max. intensity: MMI VIII (Severe)
- Casualties: 348 killed

The 1977 Naghan earthquake struck Chaharmahal and Bakhtiari province in Iran on April 6 at 13:36 UTC. The earthquake measuring 6.0 M_{w} occurred at a depth of 15 km (9.3 mi) and had a maximum Modified Mercalli intensity of VIII (Severe). More than 2,100 homes were destroyed and at least 348 people died.

== Tectonic setting ==
Iran is a region that accommodates oblique convergence through thrust and strike-slip faults with clear geomorphic expression at the surface. These pure thrust and pure strike-slip faults run parallel to each other. Beginning in the Miocene or Cenozoic, continental collision involving the Arabian plate and Central Iran formed the 1,200 km (750 mi)-long Zagros Mountains. The mountain belt trends northwest–southeast from Eastern Anatolia to the Strait of Hormuz. Approximately 30–50 percent of the ~25 cm (9.8 in)/yr convergence between the Arabian and Eurasian plates is accommodated along the Zagros.

== Earthquake ==
Major faults in this zone include the Main Zagros Reverse Fault (MZRF) which is an inactive thrust fault bounding the northern Zagros. This fault was active when subduction was ongoing. The fault became inactive when suturing occurred and continental collision began. The Kazerun—Borazjan Fault (KBF) system is another major structure, consisting of a wide zone of right-lateral faults that cuts through the belt. It lies in the middle of the belt. To the east, the Zagros fold and thrust zone accommodates convergence through thrust and strike-slip faulting. Strike-slip faulting is mainly accommodated along the northwest–southeast trending Main Recent Fault which displays right-lateral displacement. The fault is parallel to the MZRF and mountain belt. The KBF fault accommodate the different rate of convergence between the northwestern and southeastern belt. It consists of three segments—the Dena, Kazerun, and Borazjan faults. At its southern extent, these fault segments curve to the east and display reverse faulting. The northern KBF meets the Main Recent Fault (Ardal Fault segment) near Borujen where it also accommodates strike-slip deformation. The MRF also runs parallel to the belt.

Seismicity on the Ardal Fault is high—earthquakes were recorded near the fault in 1666, 1874 and 1880. Along the Dena Fault, earthquakes were recorded in 1934, 1975 and 1989. The earthquake on April 6, 1977, occurred near the Ardal Fault. It displayed a both reverse and strike-slip focal mechanism but no surface ruptures were identified. The fault plane was identified as trending west-northwest–east-southeast. A focal depth of 6 km (3.7 mi) was calculated. The reverse focal mechanism is inconsistent with rupture on the Dena Fault and suggest it was produced on the Dopolan or the Gazulak faults. These north–northeast dipping reverse faults produce surface expressions further south of the epicenter.

== Impact ==
The earthquake devastated a 150 km^{2} (58 sq mi) area where a large majority of homes in the area were constructed of brick and masonry. Due to their brittle walls and heavy roofs, many of these construction were damaged or collapsed, often killing people. At least 348 people died, another 200 were injured, and approximately 2,100 homes were heavily damaged. A maximum Modified Mercalli intensity of VIII (Severe) was assigned.

The highest number of deaths was recorded at Naghan, where 202 died. There were 43 deaths at Jaghdan; 64 at Ardal; and 11 at Dastgerd. Eight schools were razed while another 37 were damaged. Because the earthquake occurred during a period of heavy rainfall, it areas on alluvium became water-saturated high clay which worsened the damage. Some villages built on the slopes of the mountains were damaged or flattened by landslides. In Jaghdan, all adobe brick homes were destroyed. Masonry construction were also affected and one school in Ardal was partially destroyed. There was additional damage from several aftershocks measuring in the magnitude range of 4 to 5.

== See also ==
- List of earthquakes in 1977
- List of earthquakes in Iran
