= Shur River (Hormozgan) =

River in Iran

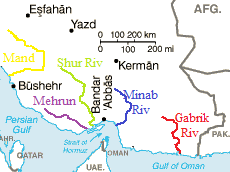
Map of rivers in South Iran

Shur River (Persian: رود شور) is located in southern Iran and flows into the Gulf of Oman in Hormozgan.

The river flows through the arid Lut Desert. In 2005, NASA's Aqua satellite recorded surface temperature in the area at 70.7 °C. The salinity of the river derives from the salt rock in the hills near the headwaters and further reduces the level of plant life along the river. The river has been dammed by international mining interests looking to extract the rich mineral deposits in the area.
