= 1977 Khurgu earthquake =

Earthquake in Iran

- Location within Iran
- UTC time: 1977-03-21 21:18:54
- ISC event: 701441
- USGS-ANSS: ComCat
- Local date
- Local time
- Magnitude: 6.7 M_{w}
- Depth: 12.5 km (7.8 mi)
- Epicenter: 27.584°N 56.378°E
- Type: Thrust
- Areas affected: Iran
- Max. intensity: MMI IX (Violent)
- Casualties: 152–167 dead, 556 injured

The 1977 Khurgu earthquake struck southern Iran near Bandar Abbas in Hormozgan province on the morning of March 22. The earthquake measuring moment magnitude (M_{w}) 6.7 struck at a depth of 12.5 km (7.8 mi). Thirty five villages were heavily damaged including over 20 which were destroyed. There were 152–167 people killed and 556 injured.

== Tectonic setting ==
The Zagros Mountains extend southeast from Turkey to the Gulf of Oman for ~1,600 km (990 mi), representing a convergent boundary. They are part of the Alpine orogeny, and are the youngest continental collision zone in the world. Collision occurs between Arabia and central Iran began in the late Eocene after the subduction of the Neotethys Ocean ceased. The Zagros region accommodates nearly half the current convergence rate between Arabia and Iran. In the east–west trending southeastern Zagros, the convergence rate is fastest (~9 mm (0.35 in)/yr), and accommodated by crustal shortening. In the central and northwestern Zagros, its strike changes to northwest–southeast. Here, convergence is oblique and occurs at ~4 mm (0.16 in)/yr.

== Earthquake ==
The earthquake struck at 21:18 UTC with an epicenter north-northeast of Bandar Abbabas. It was caused by shallow thrust faulting on either a north- or south-dipping fault plane as indicated by its focal mechanism. This region hosts active faults that form the Zagros fold and thrust belt. It had an epicenter located beneath an anticline in the southeastern Zagros. The steeply-dipping blind thrust faults in the area inferred from topographic and stratigraphic studies were likely responsible for earthquakes in the southeastern Zagros. The Mountain Front Fault was associated with the event, together with a historical earthquake in 1052 CE and many smaller instrumentally recorded earthquakes. Other faults that were inferred included the Dezful Embayment, Zagros Foredeep, Surmeh, Lar and Beriz-Dehkuyeh faults. The High Zagros Fault was the only mapped fault because it ruptured the surface. The Zagros Foredeep and Mountain Front faults are located at the frontal region of the range and runs parallel to them. A 26 km (16 mi) long ground fracture was observed in the center of high intensity zone, VIII–IX (Severe–Violent). Another 7 km (4.3 mi) ground fracture occurred in the western part of the zone. No surface faulting was observed.

== Impact ==
The death toll was moderate (152–167 killed out of a population of 11,117) due to the occurrence of a strong foreshock that was widely felt. A foreshock occurring 10–15 seconds before the mainshock woke many residents from their sleep and rushed out of their homes before the mainshock. This helped reduce the number of fatalities, but most of the casualties were the seniors and children who could evacuate their homes as the mainshock occurred. The earthquake also destroyed about 1.3 percent of the area's livestock.

A 550 km^{2} (210 sq mi) area was devastated; more than 1,500 homes were heavily damaged. Because most building destruction was partial, the duration of the earthquake's strong ground motion was interpreted to be brief. Buildings near the epicenter had traditional designs and minimal variations, and comprised mainly clay bricks, stones and mud. Engineers concluded that the shaking caused structural failure to initiate at the corners of buildings before progressing to the walls and resulting in the roof caving-in. The appearance of vertical cracks in support columns further suggest that the earthquake's ground motion contained a large vertical component. This was also supported by evidence of overturned stones. The road connecting Bandar Abbas and Kerman was also affected; side wall of the southern entrance of a tunnel near the Khurgu salt dome was cracked. Near the tunnel, cracks were reported in the road bank. South of the epicenter, a bridge across the Shur River also experienced minor cracks.

There were no casualties in Bandar Abbas, 40 km (25 mi) south of the epicenter, where damage was slight. Buildings in the city were recently constructed and designed to resist seismic events. Damage was extensive at the Gameron Hotel, where a wing was severely cracked. Many guests panicked and rushed to exit the hotel. At the city airport, hairline cracks developed in concrete columns and tiles fell. Due to the increased urban development in this earthquake-prone area, seismic instruments in the city recorded ground motions from the earthquake. The earthquake was also felt on Kish island where the Shah was residing at. Aircraft from Tehran flew into Bandar Abbas to bring relief supplies. Iran Air performed emergency flights to ferry tourists out of Bandar Abbas.

== See also ==
- List of earthquakes in 1977
- List of earthquakes in Iran
