= Asr-e Iran =

Iran news website

- Website type: News website
- Headquarters: {{{location_country}}}
- Owner: Jafar Mohammadi
- Website: www.asriran.com
- Launched: 2006

Asr-e Iran (Persian: عصر ایران) (lit. 'Iranian Era') is a Iranian news website.

== History and management ==
Asr-e Iran was established in 2006 by a group of Iranian journalists. It is owned by Jafar Mohammadi and the managing director is Mohammad Hossein Jafari. Some sources in the 2010s described it as close to then-mayor of Tehran Mohammad Bagher Ghalibaf.

== Content ==
Asr-e Iran has been primarily described as editorially reformist and moderate, with some also considering it conservative. It is one of Iran's most visited news websites, and publishes both short and analytical news articles.
