= 1853 Shiraz earthquake =

Earthquake in Iran

- Location within Iran
- Local date: 22 April 1853
- Local time: noon
- Epicenter: 29.6°N 52.5°E
- Areas affected: Iran
- Max. intensity: MMI IX (Violent)
- Casualties: 9,000–13,000

The Fars region of Iran was struck by a major earthquake on either 22 April or 5 May 1853. The city of Shiraz and the surrounding area were severely affected, with almost all buildings destroyed. At least 9,000 people were killed, with some estimates reaching 13,000.

== Tectonic setting ==
Iran lies across the complex plate boundary where the Arabian plate is colliding with the Eurasian plate. The Fars region lies within the outermost part of the Zagros fold and thrust belt. This Fars Domain is affected by the presence of thick Neoproterozoic salt of the Hormuz Formation, forming part of the so-called simply folded zone. Despite its name, the folding is accompanied by thrusting, with some strike-slip faulting, such as on the right-lateral Kazerun fault system. From the analysis of hypocentral depths and focal mechanisms, the earthquakes are caused by both faulting within the underlying basement and towards the base of the thick sedimentary cover sequence. Almost all earthquakes occur on blind faults, with no surface rupture.

== Earthquake sequence ==
The sequence began at about dawn on the day before the mainshock, with the first of a series of foreshocks. These continued throughout that day and into the following morning. The mainshock occurred at about noon, followed by a major aftershock six hours later.

== Damage ==
The second foreshock caused severe damage in the Gawd-i Araban quarter, destroying a mosque, part of the bazaar and many houses, and causing widespread damage in the rest of the city. There was local ground liquefaction and some qanats collapsed. The third major foreshock, which occurred about 15 minutes before the mainshock, led to further damage, including the collapse of one of the minarets of the Masjid-i'Abbas mosque.

The mainshock left the city devastated, all buildings and other structures within 12 km of the city were described as "ruined". Notable buildings that were either destroyed or severely damaged included the remaining parts of the Masjid-i'Abbas, the Shah Cheragh monument and mosque, the Armenian Church and the Madraseh Khan. Most of the Masjid-i Nau also collapsed, while the Masjid-i Vakil and the Vakil Bazaar were mainly unaffected.

The major aftershock later that day led to further damage and casualties.
