= 2020 Iran–Turkey earthquakes =

Earthquakes that occurred on 23 February 2020 in Khoy, Iran

- Location within Iran Location within Turkey
- UTC time: A: 2020-02-23 05:53:01; B: 2020-02-23 16:00:31
- ISC event: A: 617549836; B: 617549818
- USGS-ANSS: A: ComCat; B: ComCat
- Local date: 23 February 2020
- Local time: A: 09:23 IRST (UTC+3:30); B: 19:30 IRST
- Magnitude: A: 5.8 M_{w}; B: 6.0 M_{w}
- Depth: A: 10.0 km (6 mi); B: 10.0 km (6 mi)
- Epicentre: 38°33′01″N 44°57′08″E
- Type: Oblique-slip normal
- Areas affected: Iran, Turkey
- Max. intensity: MMI VII (Very strong)
- Casualties: 10 dead, 141 injured

The first and most destructive of the 2020 Iran–Turkey earthquakes occurred on 23 February, near Khoy in north-west Iran, close to the border with Turkey, killing 9 people in Başkale, Van. It hit at 9:23 a.m. local time (05:53 UTC) with a magnitude of 5.8 M_{w} at a depth of 6 kilometres (3.7 miles) and the epicenter was Qotur district, according to the Iranian Seismological Center (IRSC). About 10 hours later the same area was hit by another major earthquake of 6.0 M_{w}.

== Tectonic setting ==
Northwestern Iran and easternmost Turkey lie within the zone of complex structure associated with the continuing collision between the Arabian plate and the Eurasian plate. On this part of the boundary the collision is quite oblique and the thrust faulting along the front of the Zagros fold and thrust belt is accompanied by a series of NW–SE trending dextral (right-lateral) strike-slip faults, such as the North Tabriz Fault and the Gailatu–Siah Chesh-meh–Khoy Fault. Normal faults are developed at terminations and releasing bends on the strike-slip faults. The entire fault system is active and has been associated with many destructive earthquakes.

== Earthquakes ==
The first of the larger earthquakes had a magnitude of 5.8 M_{w} with a depth of 10 km (ANSS), 5.8 M_{L} with a depth of 8 km (KOERI), or 5.7 mb_{Lg} with a depth of 6 km (Iranian Seismological Center (IRSC)). It was followed just over 10 hours later by the second event, which had a magnitude of 6.0 M_{w} with a depth of 10 km (ANSS), 5.8 M_{L} with a depth of 5 km (KOERI), or 5.9 mb_{Lg} with a depth of 12 km (IRSC).

== Damage ==
The area of significant damage stretched from the city of Van in the west to Khoy in Iran to the east. More than 1,000 buildings were destroyed in Turkey, with many others damaged in 43 affected villages in Iran. The Turkish health ministry reported that nine people had died, four of them children, with another 66 injured. 75 people were reported injured in Iran. No further casualties have been reported in Turkey following the M_{w} 6.0 earthquake. Death toll climbed to 10 when a teenager later died in the hospital.

== See also ==
- List of earthquakes in 2020
- 2020s in environmental history
- List of earthquakes in Iran
- List of earthquakes in Turkey
