= 1893 Quchan earthquake =

Earthquake in Iran

- Location within Iran
- Local date: November 17, 1893
- Local time: 19:30
- Magnitude: 6.6 M_{s}
- Epicenter: 37.2°N 58.4°E
- Areas affected: Iran
- Max. intensity: MMI IX (Violent)
- Casualties: 18,000

The 1893 Quchan earthquake occurred at about 19:30 local time (15:06 UTC) on 17 November. It had an estimated magnitude of 6.6 on the surface-wave magnitude scale and a maximum perceived intensity of IX (Violent) on the Mercalli intensity scale. It caused severe damage in Quchan County, particularly to the town of Quchan itself and there were an estimated 18,000 casualties.

== Tectonic setting ==
The Kopet Dag mountain range lies at the northern edge of the complex zone of deformation caused by the continuing collision of the Arabian plate with the Eurasian plate. To the west it links with the Caucasus Mountains through the Caspian Sea. There is currently about 3 mm per year of shortening across the Kopet Dag as a whole. The Quchan Fault zone, trending NNW-SSE, is one of a set of active right lateral strike-slip faults that accommodate part of the shortening across the Kopet Dag and extension along its length. It has an estimated displacement rate of about 1.5 mm per year. The damage areas of the sequence of earthquakes that affected the Quchan area between 1851 and 1895 follow the projected path of the Quchan fault and its likely continuation as a thrust fault in the Atrak valley, where it forms a surface anticline.

== Earthquake ==
The shock was felt over a wide area, including all Turkmenistan and as far away as Tehran. It was preceded by a strong foreshock on 20 October. There were damaging aftershocks on both 18 and 19 November, with the latter being the most severe.

== Damage ==
The city of Quchan was almost completely destroyed, with only a few houses strengthened with wooden braces following the 1871 earthquake surviving.

== Aftermath ==
The winter that followed the earthquake was unusually severe, causing many further deaths. Just over a year later, on January 17, 1895, Quchan was again devastated by an earthquake, although the death toll was lower, as very few houses of adobe construction had survived the 1893 event and new houses were generally of wooden construction.

== See also ==
- List of earthquakes in Iran
- List of historical earthquakes
