= 1727 Tabriz earthquake =

- Location within Iran
- Local date: November 18, 1727
- Epicenter: 38.0°N 46.3°E
- Areas affected: Iran, Tabriz
- Max. intensity: MMI VIII (Severe)
- Casualties: 77,000

The 1727 Tabriz earthquake occurred on 18 November with an epicenter near Tabriz in northwest Iran. The maximum felt intensity was VIII (Severe) on the Mercalli intensity scale, and there were an estimated 77,000 deaths. The only record for this earthquake comes from an account written in 1821 and it is very likely that the information for this earthquake refers instead to the 1721 Tabriz earthquake.

== See also ==
- List of earthquakes in Iran
- List of historical earthquakes
