= 1721 Tabriz earthquake =

Catastrophic earthquake in Iran

- Location within Iran
- Local date: April 26, 1721
- Magnitude: 7.7 M_{s}
- Epicenter: 38.0°N 46.3°E
- Areas affected: Iran, Tabriz
- Max. intensity: MMI VIII (Severe) – MMI X (Extreme)
- Casualties: 8,000–250,000

The 1721 Tabriz earthquake occurred on April 26, with an epicenter near the city of Tabriz, Iran. It leveled some three-quarters of the city, including many prominent mosques and schools in the city, and resulted in the deaths of tens of thousands of people. The total number of casualties caused by the earthquake is between 8,000 and 250,000; it was most likely approximately 80,000. At the time that it occurred, the earthquake was popularly interpreted as an omen of misfortune, or a demonstration of godly wrath. The destruction that the earthquake caused was a significant factor in the successful Ottoman Empire takeover of Tabriz in 1725, as well as contributing to Tabriz's economic difficulties during that period. It also caused the destruction of some of the city's significant historical monuments. Accounts of the earthquake are often confused with descriptions of the 1727 Tabriz earthquake.

== See also ==
- List of earthquakes in Iran
- List of historical earthquakes

== Sources ==
- Matthee, Rudi (2012). Persia in Crisis: Safavid Decline and the Fall of Isfahan. I.B.Tauris. ISBN 978-1845117450.
