= 2012 East Azerbaijan earthquakes =

Doublet earthquakes in northwest Iran

- Location within Iran
- UTC time: Doublet earthquake: A: 2012-08-11 12:23:17; B: 2012-08-11 12:34:36
- ISC event: A: 604084447; B: 604846898
- USGS-ANSS: A: ComCat; B: ComCat
- Local date: August 11, 2012
- Local time: UTC+04.30; A: 16:53; B: 17:04
- Magnitude: 6.4 M_{w}; A: 6.2 M_{w}^{(GCMT)}
- Depth: A: 9 km (5.6 mi) B: 19 km (12 mi)
- Epicenter: 38.359°N 46.786°E
- Areas affected: Iran
- Max. intensity: MMI VIII (Severe)
- Aftershocks: at least 60
- Casualties: 306 dead, 3,037 injured

The 2012 East Azerbaijan earthquakes – also known as the Ahar earthquakes – occurred on 11 August 2012, at 16:53 Iran Standard Time, near the cities of Ahar and Varzaqan in Iran's East Azerbaijan province, approximately 60 kilometers (37 miles) from Tabriz. They comprised a doublet separated by eleven minutes, with magnitudes of 6.4 and 6.2 M_{ww}. At least 306 people died and more than 3,000 others were injured, primarily in the rural and mountainous areas to the northeast of Tabriz (though 45 died in the city of Ahar). The shocks were felt in Armenia and the Republic of Azerbaijan, though no major damage was reported.

== Tectonic setting ==
Iran lies within the complex zone of continental collision between the Arabian plate and the Eurasian plate, which extends from the Bitlis-Zagros belt in the south to the Greater Caucasus Mountains, the Absheron-Balkan Sill and the Kopet Dag mountains in the north. The collision between these plates deforms an area of ~ 3,000,000 km^{2} of continental crust. It is one of the largest convergent deformation regions on Earth. In northwestern Iran, the Arabian plate is moving northwards at about 20 mm per year relative to the Eurasian plate, somewhat oblique to the plate boundary zone. The deformation in the area near Tabriz is dominated by the North Tabriz Fault, a WNW-ESE trending right-lateral strike-slip fault, which has been responsible for 7 historical earthquakes of magnitude greater than 6 since AD 858. Other known active faults include a W-E trending fault between the cities of Ahar and Heris.

== Earthquakes ==
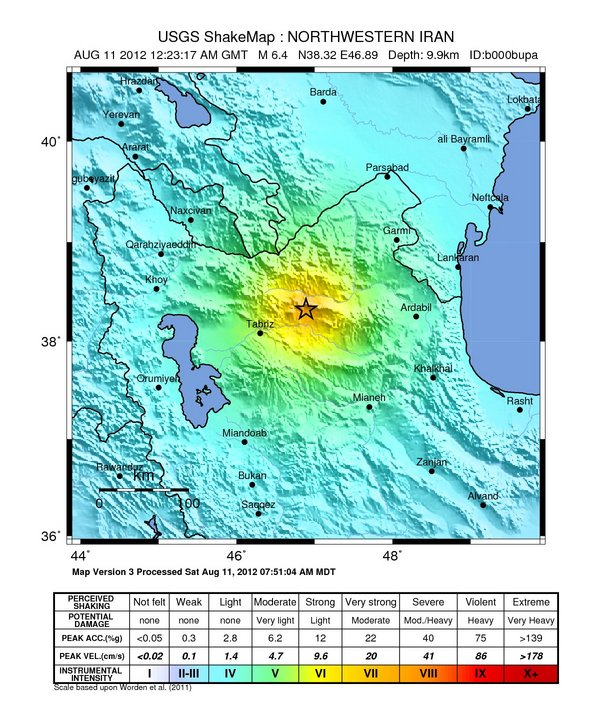
USGS ShakeMap for the mainshock

The 6.4 and 6.2 intraplate earthquakes occurred as a result of oblique strike-slip faulting in the shallow crust about 300 km east of the Eurasia-Arabian plate boundary. The two earthquakes are separated by 10 km in an east–west direction.

== Damage and casualties ==
Iran's state television reported the earthquake hit near the towns of Ahar, Heris and Varzaqan in East Azerbaijan province at 4:53 p.m. local time (12:23 GMT). "268 people, 219 women and 49 men, lost their lives in hospitals" while the rest were killed on the spot, Iran's Health Minister Marzieh Vahid-Dastjerdi said. The Iranian minister added that 3,037 people have been injured as a result of Saturday's temblors. According to the head of Iran's Rescue and Relief Organisation, access to villages has been cut and the only communication is via radio. The worst damage and most casualties were in villages near the towns of Ahar, Varzaghan and Heris. In villages near Varzaqan, with most men away from home working, the many mud brick houses which collapsed trapped mainly women and children inside.

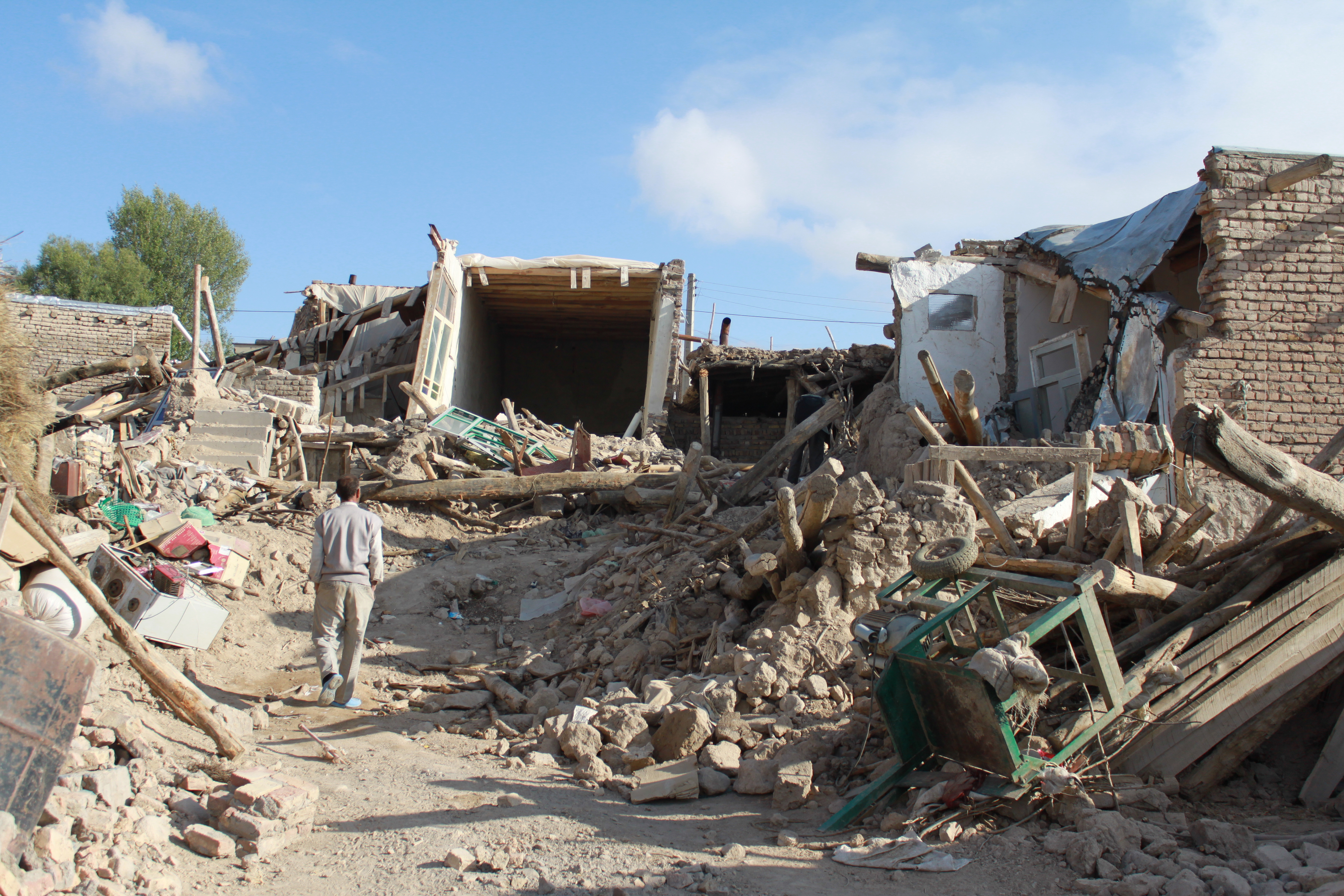
Many villages were completely destroyed

Sixty-six rescue teams were sent to the affected region, along with about 200 ambulances and five helicopters. One hundred and thirty villages were 70–90 percent destroyed, and 20 were completely leveled. At least 45 people died and more than 500 were injured in Ahar, where electricity and phone lines were cut after the earthquakes. More than 40 people died in the city of Varzaqan and 50 were killed in Heris. The medical infrastructure in the catastrophe stricken region is not sufficient, and many heavily injured did not survive the rather long way to the nearest hospital.

Most parts of Tabriz also lost electricity, and the city had a large traffic jam. Some buildings were structurally damaged. Over 200 people in Varzaqan and Ahar were extricated from under the debris of collapsed buildings, and local provincial officials asked people in the region to stay outdoors during the night because of the danger of aftershocks. Some residents needed bread, tents and drinking water.

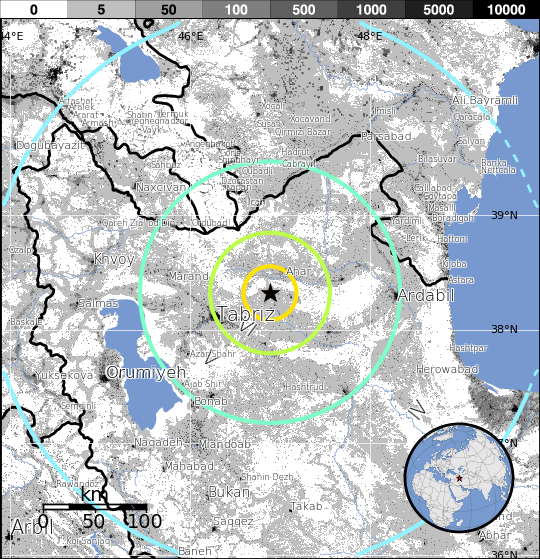
Population exposure from the first shock

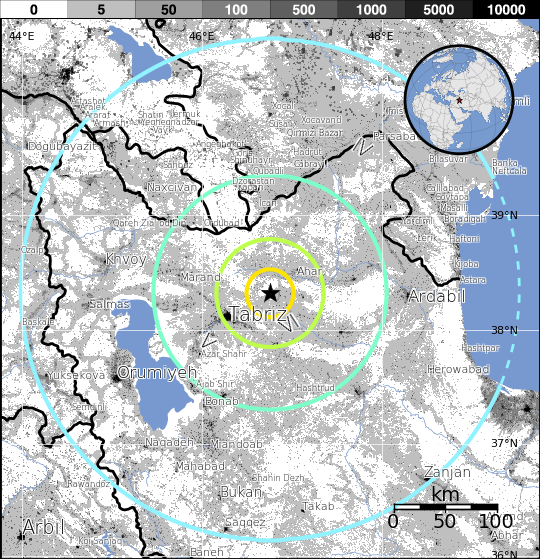
Population exposure from the second shock

Rescue teams continued searching for survivors through the night, Iranian officials said they expected the death toll to rise. Between ten and twenty villages close to the epicenter were still cut off from aid and it would take some time to reach them. The Iranian government estimated at least 16,000 people spent the first night after the quakes in emergency shelters.

A day after the quakes, more than 36,000 people had been given emergency shelter, and the Iranian government had dispatched nearly 100 ambulances, 1,100 Red Crescent workers, 44,000 food packages and 5,600 tents. According to Red Crescent officials, more than 1,000 villages were affected by the disaster, and at least 5,000 people were injured. Hospitals in the region's major cities were overcrowded and struggling to cope with the large number of people waiting for treatment.

=== Aftershocks ===
At least 80 aftershocks were felt. A 5.0 quake struck three hours later and a 5.1 aftershock struck 31 km southwest of Ahar on 12 August.

On 14 August, three days after the initial quakes, another 5.1 aftershock struck the same area at a depth of 10 km. An even stronger 5.3 tremor occurred on 15 August, approximately 34 km southwest of Ahar.

== Reaction ==
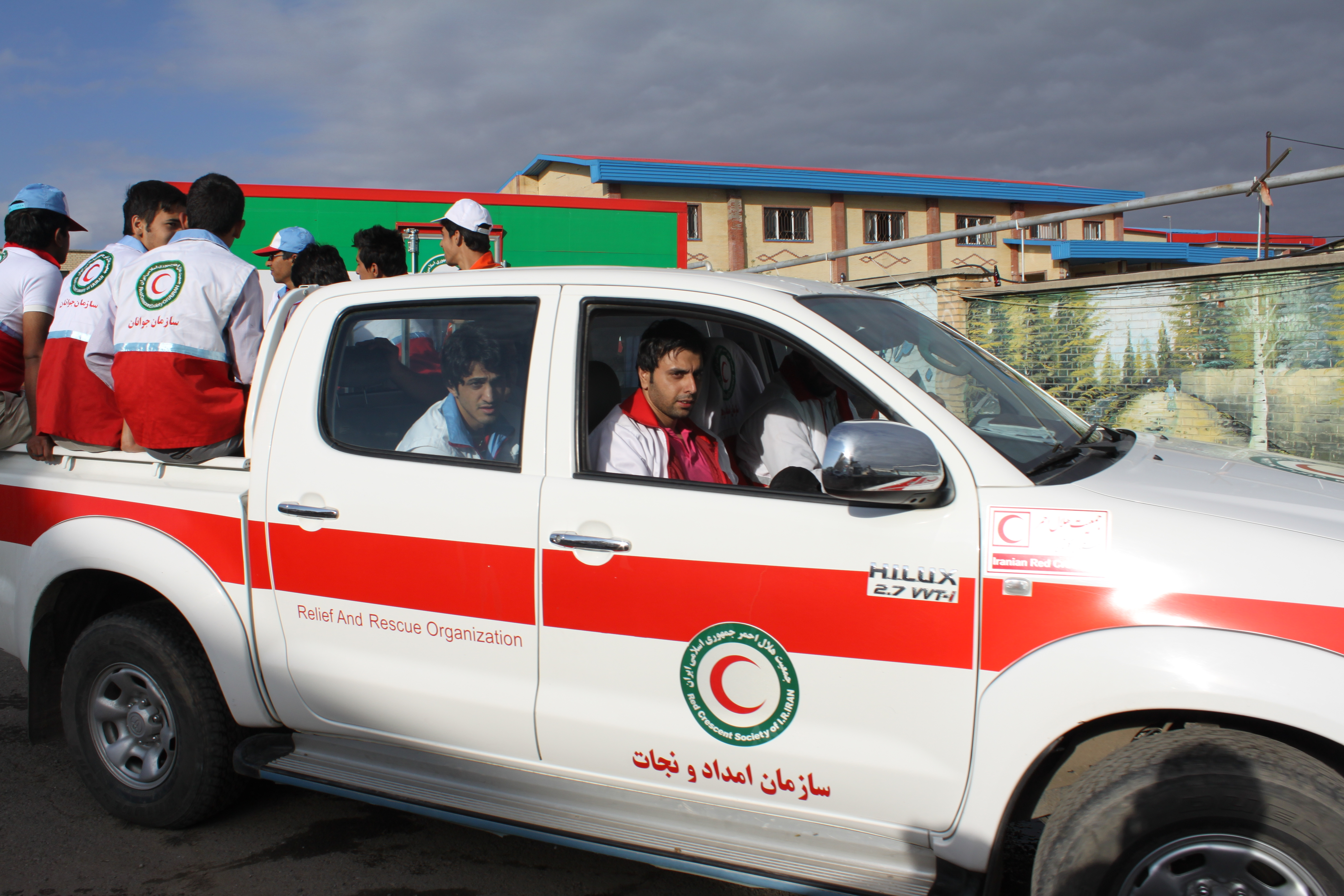
A relief car of Iranian Red Crescent

=== Domestic ===
The East Azerbaijan province governor announced two days of public mourning in the province. Mostafa Mohammad Najjar, Minister of Interior and Marzieh Vahid Dastjerdi, Minister of Health traveled to the area on 12 August to assist in coordinating the emergency response. The Iranian Red Crescent did not request any international assistance.

=== International ===
In the first two days, the Iranian Red Crescent said they would not accept outside help. Three days later, the Iranian government announced it would accept foreign help.

- United Nations Secretary-General Ban Ki-moon's office issued a press release that read: "[He was] deeply saddened by the loss of hundreds of lives" and that the UN was ready to lend assistance and mobilize international support. The release said Ban "extends his sincere condolences to the Iranian government and people, particularly the families of those who have been killed or otherwise affected in this disaster."
- (Armenia) Armenian officials said the relief aid approved by Prime Minister Tigran Sargsyan's cabinet included tents, blankets, portable beds, sleeping bags, canned food and drinking water.
- Azerbaijan sent an aid convoy of 25 trucks carrying 460 tents, 1,000 beds, 3,000 blankets, 20 tons of rice, 40 tons of flour and 58 tons of other food products to Ahar on 13 August. President Ilham Aliyev expressed his condolences with regard to the earthquake. The region was visited by Azerbaijani MP Ganira Pashayeva.
- The Japanese ambassador to Iran, Kinichi Komano, expressed his government's sympathy with the earthquake victims and announced Japan's readiness to provide humanitarian aid.
- Pakistani President Asif Zardari and PM Raja Ashraf separately expressed condolences. The government of Pakistan dispatched a C-130 loaded with relief goods including tents, flour and milk on 13 August.
- (Russia) Russian President Vladimir Putin expressed his condolences and offered help.
- (Syria) Syrian President Bashar al-Assad sent a cable to Iranian President Mahmoud Ahmadinejad expressing condolences, personally and on behalf of Syrians, to the victims and their families and wishing the wounded quick recoveries.
- Taiwan's government expressed its condolences to the families of victims and offered assistance.
- (Turkey) The Turkish Red Crescent sent a truck with emergency supplies to the border. The Turkish Foreign Ministry also said it was ready to help, if the need arises.
- The government of the United Arab Emirates expressed condolences and offered assistance.

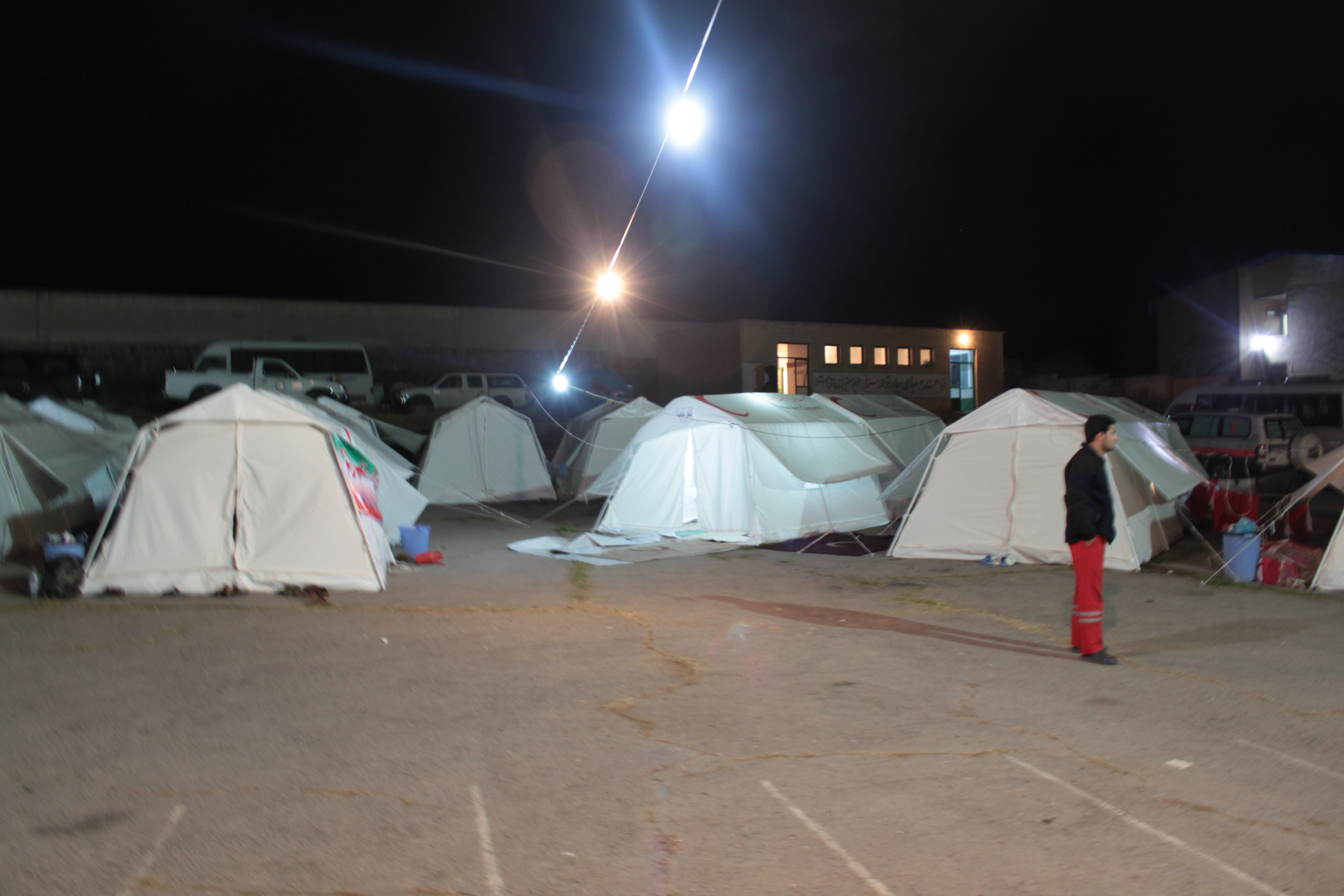
Temporary accommodation tents

- (United States) The White House Press Secretary Jay Carney released the following statement on 12 August: "The American people send the Iranian people our deepest condolences for the loss of life in the tragic earthquake in northwestern Iran. Our thoughts are with the families of those who were lost, and we wish the wounded a speedy recovery. We stand ready to offer assistance in this difficult time."
- (Vatican City) Pope Benedict XVI, in his Sunday Angelus at the papal summer residence at Castel Gandolfo, stated: "Dear brothers and sisters, my thoughts are, at this moment ... to those of northwestern Iran, struck by a violent earthquake. These events have resulted in many victims and injured, thousands of displaced people and extensive damage. I invite you to join in my prayers for those who have lost their lives, and for all the affected people tried by these devastating disasters. These brothers and sisters need our solidarity and our support."

=== Criticism of Iranian government and state TV's late response ===
The Iranian government was criticized regarding to crisis management of the earthquake. The decision to stop the search for survivors after 24 hours was based on a government assessment that all survivors had been rescued from the rubble; an unnamed local doctor disputed the likelihood of that assessment based on the remoteness of some villages. A lack of tents for the homeless was also cited by members of the Majlis. The IRIB was criticised in an editorial in the Asr-e Iran newspaper for its perceived lack of news coverage of the earthquake. In a Majlis meeting on 13 August 2012, MPs from the affected region questioned President Mahmoud Ahmadinejad for not visiting the area and for not announcing public mourning. That day, Iran then announced two days of public mourning.

== See also ==
- List of earthquakes in 2012
- List of earthquakes in Iran
- 2019 East Azerbaijan earthquake

== Sources ==
- ANSS. "2012a East Azerbaijan". Comprehensive Catalog. U.S. Geological Survey.
- ANSS. "2012b East Azerbaijan". Comprehensive Catalog. U.S. Geological Survey.
- International Seismological Centre. ISC-EHB Bulletin. Thatcham, United Kingdom.
