= List of earthquakes in Iran =

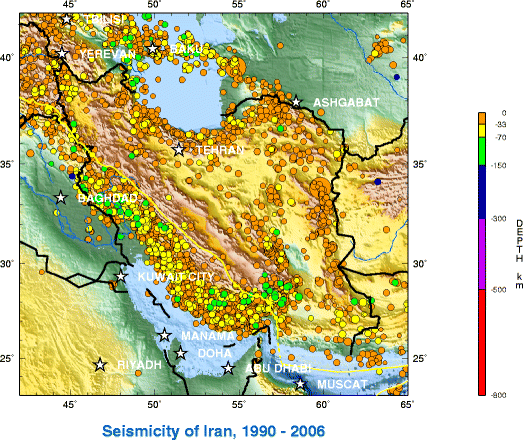
Earthquakes in Iran from 1990 to 2006, by United States Geological Survey

Iran Faults

Iran is one of the most seismically active countries in the world, being crossed by several major faults that cover at least 90% of the country. As a result, earthquakes in Iran occur often and are destructive.

== Geology and history ==
The Iranian plateau is subject to most types of tectonic activity, including active folding, faulting and volcanic eruptions. It is well known for its long history of disastrous earthquake activity. Not only have these earthquakes killed thousands, but they have also led to waste of valuable natural resources. Since 1900, at least 126,000 fatalities have resulted from earthquakes in Iran. In addition, the Iranian plate is bordered by the Indian plate (to the southeast), the Eurasian plate (to the north), and the Arabian plate (to the south and west), which is where the Zagros fold and thrust belt (an ancient subduction zone) lies.

== Present danger ==
On Sunday, December 28, 2025, Iranian news media reported the occurrence of an earthquake in the northeastern province of Tehran. They also published a report indicating that in the event of a major earthquake in Greater Tehran, 73% of all highways and roads would be damaged beyond repair, making all rescue operations impossible. The reaction of Mehdi Chamran, Chairman of the Tehran City Council: “We hope and pray to God that an earthquake does not occur; otherwise, we will face a major problem.” Parviz Sorouri, Vice Chairman of the Tehran City Council, said: “Tehran is located on active fault lines, and this is undeniable. In the event of a severe earthquake in Tehran, we may face an unprecedented or nearly unprecedented catastrophe in world history.” Recently, Ali Beitollahi, Head of the Engineering Seismology and Seismic Risk Department at the Road, Housing, and Urban Development Research Center, said: “The phenomenon of land subsidence is increasingly developing across Iran and threatens 40 percent of the country’s population.”

== Earthquakes ==
| Date | Province | Mag. | MMI | Deaths | Injuries | Total damage / notes | Citations |
|---|---|---|---|---|---|---|---|
| 2024-06-18 | Razavi Khorasan | 4.9 mb | | 4 | 120 | Severe damage | |
| 2023-03-24 | West Azerbaijan | 5.6 M_{w} | VIII | | 165 | Severe damage | |
| 2023-01-28 | West Azerbaijan | 5.9 M_{w} | VII | 3 | 1,750 | Widespread damage | |
| 2023-01-18 | West Azerbaijan | 5.7 M_{w} | VI | | 252 | Severe damage | |
| 2022-10-05 | West Azerbaijan | 5.6 M_{w} | VII | | 1,127 | Severe damage | |
| 2022-07-23 | Hormozgan | 5.6 M_{w} | VII | | 1 | Minor damage | |
| 2022-07-03 | Gilan | 4.1 mb | | | 1 | Minor damage | |
| 2022-07-01 | Hormozgan | 6.0 M_{w} | VII | 7 | 111 | Severe damage / doublet | |
| 2022-06-25 | Hormozgan | 5.6 M_{w} | VII | 1 | 37 | | |
| 2022-04-23 | Fars | 4.4 mb | VI | | 1 | Minor damage | |
| 2022-03-20 | Fars | 4.7 mb | VII | | 2 | Minor damage | |
| 2022-03-16 | Hormozgan | 5.9 M_{w} | VII | | 2 | Minor damage | |
| 2022-01-23 | East Azerbaijan | 4.0 mb | VII | | 1 | | |
| 2021-11-14 | Hormozgan | 6.4 M_{w} | IX | 2 | 98 | Doublet | |
| 2020-05-07 | Tehran | 4.6 mb | V | 2 | 38 | | |
| 2020-02-23 | West Azerbaijan | 5.8 M_{w} | VII | 10 | 125 | | |
| 2019-11-07 | East Azerbaijan | 5.9 M_{w} | VII | 7 | 584 | | |
| 2019-07-08 | Khuzestan | 5.6 M_{w} | VII | 1 | 100 | | |
| 2018-11-25 | Kermanshah | 6.3 M_{w} | VI | 1 | 761 | Aftershock | |
| 2018-08-25 | Kermanshah | 6.0 M_{w} | VII | 3 | 243 | Aftershock | |
| 2017-12-20 | Tehran | 5.2 M_{w} | VI | 2 | 97 | 4.0 M_{w} aftershock: 1 dead, 75 injured | |
| 2017-11-12 | Kermanshah | 7.3 M_{w} | IX | 630 | 8,435 | | |
| 2017-05-13 | North Khorasan | 5.6 M_{w} | VII | 3 | 370 | | |
| 2017-04-05 | Khorasan-e Razavi | 6.1 M_{w} | VII | 2 | 34 | | |
| 2017-01-06 | Fars | 5.0 M_{w} | VI | 4 | 5 | | |
| 2014-08-18 | Ilam | 6.2 M_{w} | VIII | | 60–330 | | |
| 2013-11-28 | Bushehr | 5.6 M_{w} | VII | 7 | 45 | | |
| 2013-04-13 | Sistan and Baluchestan | 7.7 M_{w} | VIII | 35 | 117 | | |
| 2013-04-09 | Bushehr | 6.3 M_{w} | VIII | 37 | 850 | | |
| 2012-08-11 | East Azerbaijan | 6.4 M_{w} | VIII | 306 | 3,037 | Doublet | |
| 2012-08-11 | East Azerbaijan | 6.3 M_{w} | | | | Doublet | |
| 2011-06-15 | Kerman | 5.3 | | 2 | | | |
| 2010-12-20 | Kerman | 6.5 M_{w} | IX | 11 | 100 | | |
| 2010-08-27 | Semnan | 5.8 M_{w} | VII | 4 | 40 | 800 displaced | |
| 2010-07-30 | Razavi Khorasan | 5.5 M_{w} | VI | | 274 | Severe damage | |
| 2008-09-10 | Qeshm | 5.9 M_{w} | VIII | 7 | 45 | | |
| 2006-03-31 | Lorestan | 6.1 M_{w} | VIII | 63–70+ | 1,246–1,418 | | |
| 2005-11-27 | Qeshm | 5.8 M_{w} | VII | 13 | 100 | | |
| 2005-02-22 | Kerman | 6.4 M_{w} | VIII | 612 | 1,411 | | |
| 2004-05-28 | Māzandarān | 6.3 M_{w} | VIII | 35 | 278–400 | $15.4 million | |
| 2003-12-26 | Kerman | 6.6 M_{w} | IX | 34,000 | 200,000 | 45,000–75,600 displaced | |
| 2002-06-22 | Qazvin | 6.3 M_{w} | VIII | 261 | 1,500 | | |
| 1999-11-19 | Semnan | 5.6 M_{w} | -- | -- | unknown | unknown | |
| 1999-03-04 | Kerman | 6.6 M_{w} | VII | 1 | | 517 houses damaged | |
| 1998-03-14 | Kerman | 6.6 M_{w} | VIII | 5 | 50 | | |
| 1997-05-10 | South Khorasan | 7.3 M_{w} | X | 1,567 | 2,300 | | |
| 1997-02-28 | Ardabil | 6.1 M_{w} | VIII | 1,100 | 2,600 | | |
| 1997-02-04 | North Khorasan | 6.5 M_{w} | VIII | 100 | 1,948 | | |
| 1990-06-20 | Gilan | 7.4 M_{w} | X | 35,000–50,000 | 60,000–105,000 | | |
| 1981-07-28 | Kerman | 7.1 M_{s} | IX | 1,500 | 1,000 | | |
| 1981-06-11 | Kerman | 6.6 M_{w} | VIII+ | 1,400–3,000 | many | | |
| 1979-11-14 | South Khorasan | 6.8 M_{w} | VIII | 297–440 | | | |
| 1978-09-16 | South Khorasan | 7.4 M_{w} | IX | 15,000–25,000 | | | |
| 1977-12-19 | Kerman | 5.9 M_{w} | VII | 584–665 | | | |
| 1977-04-06 | Chaharmahal and Bakhtiari | 6.0 M_{w} | VIII | 348–366 | | | |
| 1977-03-21 | Hormozgan | 7.0 M_{s} | VIII | 152–167 | | | |
| 1972-04-10 | Fars | 6.7 M_{w} | IX | 5,374 | 1,710 | | |
| 1970-07-30 | Khorasan | 6.4 | | 175 | 450 | | |
| 1968-08-31 | South Khorasan | 7.4 M_{w} | X | 15,000 | | | |
| 1968-09-01 | South Khorasan | 6.4 M_{w} | | 900 | | | |
| 1965-02-10 | East Azerbaijan | 5.1 | | 20 | | | |
| 1962-09-01 | Qazvin | 7.1 M_{L} | IX | 12,225 | 2,776 | | |
| 1960-04-24 | Fars | 6.0 M_{uk} | | 420 | | | |
| 1958-08-16 | Hamadan | 6.7 M_{uk} | | 132 | | | |
| 1957-12-13 | Kermanshah | 7.1 | | 1,130 | | | |
| 1957-07-02 | Māzandarān | 7.1 | | 1,200 | | | |
| 1953-02-12 | Semnan | 6.6 M_{w} | VIII | 800–973 | 140 | | |
| 1947-08-05 | South Khorasan | 7.3 | | 500 | | | |
| 1932-05-20 | Māzandarān | 5.4 M_{uk} | VIII | 1,070 | | | |
| 1930-05-07 | West Azerbaijan | 7.1 M_{w} | IX | 1,360–3,000 | | | |
| 1929-05-01 | Khorasan-e Razavi | 7.2 M_{w} | IX | 3,257–3,800 | 1,121 | | |
| 1923-05-25 | Khorasan-e Razavi | 5.9 M_{w} | VII+ | 2,200 | | More than 7 villages destroyed | |
| 1909-01-23 | Lorestan | 7.3 M_{L} | IX | 6,000–8,000 | | | |
| 1895-01-17 | Khorasan-e Razavi | 6.8 M_{s} | VIII | 1,000–11,000 | | | |
| 1893-11-17 | Khorasan-e Razavi | 6.6 M_{s} | X | 18,000 | | | |
| 1872-01-06 | North Khorasan | 5.6 | VII | 4,000 | | | |
| 1871-12-23 | North Khorasan | 6.3 | VII | 2,000 | | | |
| 1864-01-17 | Kerman | | VIII | Many | | | |
| 1853-05-05 | Fars | | IX | 9,000–13,000 | | | |
| 1778-12-15 | Kashan | 6.2 M_{s} | | >8,000 | | | |
| 1755-06-07 | Isfahan | | | 40,000 | | | |
| 1727-11-18 | East Azerbaijan | | VIII | 77,000 | | | |
| 1721-04-26 | East Azerbaijan | 7.7 M_{s} | VIII–X | 8,000–250,000 | | | |
| 1679-06-04 | Yerevan, Armenia | 6.4 M_{s} | IX–X | 7,600 | | Under Iranian rule at the time | |
| 1667-11-25 | Shamakhi, Azerbaijan | 6.9 M_{s} | X | 80,000 | | Under Iranian rule at the time | |
| 1641-02-05 | Tabriz, East Azerbaijan | 6.8 M_{s} | IX | 30,000 | | Tabriz completely destroyed | |
| 1101-??-?? | Khorasan-e Razavi | 6.5 M_{uk} | X | 60,000 | | | |
| 1042-08-21 | East Azerbaijan | 7.6 | | 40,000 | | | |
| 1008-04-11 | Bushehr | 6.5 M_{s} | | 16,000 | | | |
| 978-06-17 | Bushehr | 5.3 M_{s} | | 2,000 | | | |
| 893-03-23 | Ardabil | | | 150,000 | | See also 893 Dvin earthquake | |
| 856-12-22 | Semnan | 7.9 M_{s} | X | 200,000 | | | |
| 850-07-15 | Tehran | | | 45,000 | | | |
| 743-??-?? | Semnan | 7.2 M_{s} | IX | | | | |
| 662-04-26 | Semnan | | | 40,000 | | | |
| 400? BCE | Tehran | 7.6 | | | | | |
Note: M_{w} = moment magnitude scale, M_{s} = surface-wave magnitude, and M_{uk} = unknown. The inclusion criteria for adding events are based on WikiProject Earthquakes' notability guideline that was developed for stand alone articles. The principles described also apply to lists. In summary, only damaging, injurious, or deadly events should be recorded.

== See also ==
- Environmental issues in Iran
- Geology of Iran
- Iranian Earthquake Engineering Association (IEEA)
