= Roger Bilham =

American seismologist

Roger Bilham is an American seismologist. He won a Charles A. Whitten Medal in 2022.
