= Executive Order 14172 =

2025 U.S. order to rename Denali and the Gulf of Mexico

- "Restoring Names That Honor American Greatness"
- Front page of Executive Order 14172
- Type: Executive order
- Number: 14172
- President: Donald Trump
- Signed: January 20, 2025

Federal Register details
- Federal Register document number: 2025-02096
- Publication date: January 31, 2025

Summary
- The executive order aims to rename national landmarks, including reinstating the federal designation "Mount McKinley" and designating the Gulf of Mexico as the "Gulf of America".

Executive Order 14172, titled "Restoring Names That Honor American Greatness", is an executive order signed by Donald Trump, the 47th president of the United States, on January 20, 2025, the day of his second inauguration.

The executive order directs U.S. federal agencies to refer to the Gulf of Mexico as the "Gulf of America" and Denali, the highest mountain in North America, as "Mount McKinley" (its federal designation from 1917 to 2015). The order further outlines the process for updating the United States Board on Geographic Names (BGN).

The executive order is not binding on U.S. state governments and the private sector, although several major online map platforms, U.S.-based media outlets, and Republican-led state governments voluntarily moved to adopt the names outlined in the order. Many governments internationally, including Mexico, continue to use "Gulf of Mexico" rather than the new name.

== Background ==
The BGN is authorized to standardize geographical endonyms and exonyms within the U.S. federal government. Within the BGN, the Foreign Names Committee is responsible for maintaining the names of international waters such as the Gulf. Ordinarily, the BGN does not perform geographical renaming but rather recognizes existing names to align federal usage with local usage, eliminate offensive names, or combine duplicate records.

Publishers have established editorial policies on the selection and presentation of disputed geographical names. The stated policy of National Geographic Maps is to aim for political neutrality, annotating disputes with explanatory notes. In 2008, Google published a "primary local usage" policy for Google Maps and Google Earth, stating a preference for "names which are in widespread daily use, rather than giving immediate recognition to any arbitrary governmental re-naming", giving the Pacific Ocean as a hypothetical example. In practice, Google Maps omits some official designations, for example varying the label of the South China Sea but not labeling the West Philippine Sea as designated by the Philippine Maritime Zones Act.

=== Denali–Mount McKinley naming dispute ===
Located in Alaska, Denali is the tallest mountain in North America. For centuries, Alaska Natives have called it Denali, meaning "the high one" in the Koyukon language. Their descriptive name for the mountain contrasts with European settlers' practice of naming mountains after individuals. In 1917, the U.S. federal government named it Mount McKinley, in honor of President William McKinley, with the establishment of Mount McKinley National Park. The Alaska state government later designated it Denali, and the park was renamed Denali National Park and Preserve in 1980. In August 2015, Interior Secretary Sally Jewell announced that mountain's name would officially be changed to Denali in all federal documents. President Barack Obama announced the renaming while on a visit to Alaska in early September 2015. The Obama administration's action was criticized by the entire congressional delegation from President McKinley's home state of Ohio, as well as then presidential candidate Donald Trump, who pledged to change the federal designation back.

In December 2024, President-elect Donald Trump stated at AmericaFest that he planned to revert the mountain's official federal name to Mount McKinley during his second term. Trump's proposal was met with criticism from many prominent Alaskans. Early the next month, a poll by Alaska Survey Research found that, among 1,816 adult Alaska residents, 54% opposed renaming Denali to Mount McKinley, 26% supported it, and 20% had no opinion on the matter, with a margin of error of 2.3%. The poll found a partisan split, with those who had voted for Trump favoring Mount McKinley by 43% to 37% and those who had voted for then–Vice President Kamala Harris favoring Denali by 86% to 7%.

=== Gulf of Mexico as "Gulf of America" ===
For centuries, the Gulf of Mexico has been recognized by that name, which is derived from Mexica, the Nahuatl name for the Aztecs. The name began to be used on early European maps in 1550 and soon became established in international cartography and legal usage by bodies such as the International Hydrographic Organization.

The idea of renaming the gulf to "Gulf of America" arose much later. As chair of the BGN in the 2000s, librarian John R. Hébert received repeated petitions to this effect from one individual. In 2010, comedian Stephen Colbert humorously suggested creating a "Gulf of America fund" to help in the cleanup following the Deepwater Horizon oil spill. (Note: He said: "I don't think we can call it the Gulf of Mexico anymore. We broke it, we bought it.") In 2012, Mississippi state representative Steve Holland, a Democrat, introduced a bill proposing the name change satirically. In an interview with NPR at the time, he explained that as the Mississippi Republican Party appeared to want to push anything Mexican out of the state, renaming the body of water would help with that cause. (Note: "This new majority goes against a lot of the tenets of New Testament Christianity that I've based 29 years of legislation on," Holland told the NPR. "They want to kick immigrants out of the state, they want to drug test Medicaid people, they want to get rid of anything that's not 'America'. So I just thought it would be in keeping to introduce a bill to change the name of the Gulf of Mexico to the Gulf of America. It fits right in with what the majority thinking apparently is now.")

Dutch cartographers influenced by Petrus Plancius conceived of the Americas as the Mexican and Peruvian continents, illustrated here on a modern world map.

In early January 2025, president-elect Trump made public statements about renaming the waters as the "Gulf of America". Representative Marjorie Taylor Greene of Georgia responded by introducing House Resolution 276 to rename the gulf. At a press briefing, President Claudia Sheinbaum of Mexico mocked the idea by suggesting that North America be renamed to "Mexican America" (Spanish: América Mexicana), citing the 1814 Constitution of Apatzingán and Pieter van den Keere's Orbis terrarum typus de integro multis in locis emendatus (1607). (Note: Itself an unauthorized reproduction of a 1590s world map of the same name by Petrus Plancius.) A Harvard CAPS/Harris poll of 2,650 U.S. registered voters found that 28% of respondents supported adopting the name "Gulf of America" while 72% opposed changing the name.

During the 19th and 20th centuries, the name "Gulf of America" referred to Nakhodka Bay in the Russian Far East, commemorating the Russian corvette America. The name was replaced by an ostensibly less Western one as part of a broader renaming of geographical objects in the Russian Far East.

== Provisions ==
Agency heads are directed to review and potentially replace their appointees to the BGN. The secretary of the interior is tasked with reviewing and making additional appointments to help implement the order. The BGN is instructed to advance the policy of honoring "American heroes" in its naming and renaming decisions.

The order directs the secretary of the interior to reinstate the name "Mount McKinley" within 30 days, reversing the 2015 decision to rename it Denali. The surrounding national park area will retain the name Denali National Park and Preserve. The Secretary will also work with Alaska Native groups and local organizations to identify other landmark names that honor Alaskan history and culture.

Citing the Gulf of Mexico's importance to the U.S. economy and global commerce, the order directs the Secretary of the Interior to rename it to "Gulf of America" within 30 days, updating the Geographic Names Information System (GNIS) and ensuring that all federal documents reflect the new name. The order defines the affected body of water as the "U.S. Continental Shelf area bounded on the northeast, north, and northwest by the States of Texas, Louisiana, Mississippi, Alabama and Florida and extending to the seaward boundary with Mexico and Cuba in the area formerly named as the Gulf of Mexico". The original draft of the order focused on renaming Denali; after President Trump's statements regarding the gulf in January 2025, the provision renaming the gulf was hastily added to the draft.

The Secretary of the Interior is encouraged to seek public and intergovernmental input regarding other figures or landmarks that could be honored, particularly in light of America's upcoming 250th anniversary.

The order clarifies that it does not alter the authority of any executive department or agency, nor does it create new legal rights. It must be implemented in accordance with applicable law and the availability of appropriations.

== Legal authority ==
The executive order cites 43 U.S.C. § 364, which tasks the BGN with promoting uniformity in geographic nomenclature within the federal government. Former interior secretary Sally Jewell, whose order designating the mountain as Denali was rescinded, stated that she did not believe that Trump had direct authority to rename the mountain back to Mount McKinley, since it was under the authority of the BGN. The executive order does not compel the use of "Mount McKinley" and "Gulf of America" by non-federal agencies, private companies, or foreign entities.

President Claudia Sheinbaum of Mexico argues that the U.S. government only has the legal authority to rename the U.S. territorial sea within the gulf, up to 12 nautical miles (22 km; 14 mi) from the coast, based on the provisions of the United Nations Convention on the Law of the Sea. However, the U.S. has never ratified the convention despite recognizing some of its provisions.

A 1989 bilateral agreement with Canada requires the BGN to coordinate the name of any shared geographic feature with the Canadian Permanent Committee on Geographic Names (now the Geographical Names Board of Canada). However, no bilateral agreement requires coordination with Mexico's National Institute of Statistics and Geography or Cuba's National Commission on Geographical Names (Spanish: Comisión Nacional de Nombres Geográficos). The United Nations Group of Experts on Geographical Names has adopted a resolution that, when a dispute arises between countries that share a geographical feature, UN agencies will accept the names used by each party to the dispute, which may result in maps labeling each name simultaneously.

== Implementation ==
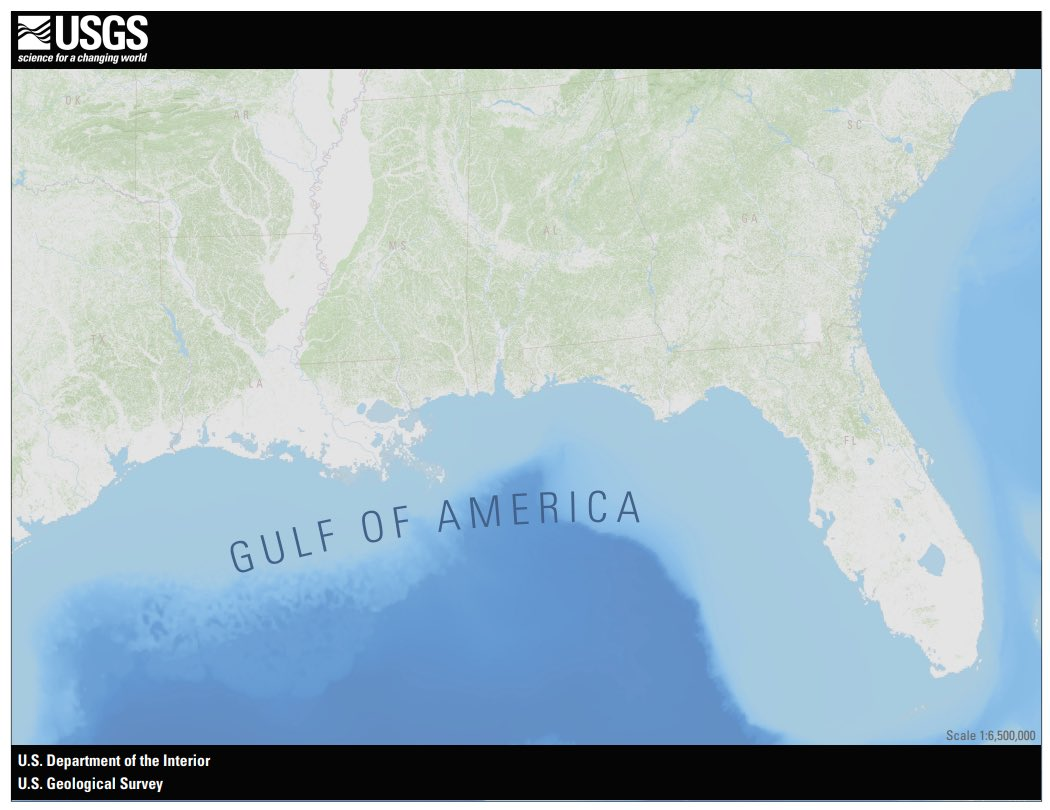
In February 2025, the United States Geological Survey began labeling the gulf as "Gulf of America" on the agency's maps.

On January 24, 2025, the Department of the Interior announced that the names Mount McKinley and "Gulf of America" were effective immediately for federal use, and that the BGN was working to update the Geographic Names Information System (GNIS) to reflect the order. In early February, Interior Secretary Doug Burgum issued Secretary's Orders 3423 and 3424, directing the BGN to update GNIS with "Gulf of America" and "Mount McKinley", respectively. The BGN rejected several proposals to revert Mount McKinley back to Denali, because overriding an executive order would require Congressional intervention.

President Trump signs the proclamation designating Gulf of America Day aboard Air Force One.

On February 9, 2025, President Trump signed a proclamation designating the day as "Gulf of America Day" while flying over the Gulf of Mexico on Air Force One from Palm Beach, Florida, to New Orleans to attend Super Bowl LIX. The United States Geological Survey timed an update to GNIS and The National Map to coincide with the proclamation, retroactive to January 20. Following the update, both GNIS and its counterpart for exonyms, the GEOnet Names Server (GNS), give "Gulf of America" as the conventional name, relegating "Gulf of Mexico" to a variant name alongside Spanish names.

Initially, the order's description of the gulf created uncertainty among mapmakers about the extent to which the gulf would be renamed. President Claudia Sheinbaum of Mexico maintains that the order only directed the secretary of the interior to rename the portion on the U.S. continental shelf, and that the legal authority to rename the gulf is limited to U.S. territorial waters. However, Secretary Burgum subsequently ordered the renaming of "the feature currently known as the Gulf of Mexico", and the modified records in both GNIS and GNS explicitly refer to the gulf as a whole, without distinguishing territorial waters or the continental shelf.

Agencies across the federal government moved to align their usage with GNIS. The Environmental Protection Agency renamed one of its water quality programs, the Gulf of Mexico Division, to the Gulf of America Division. The Federal Aviation Administration issued a charting notice that the agency's databases and aeronautical charts would be updated to say "Gulf of America" and "Mount McKinley". The National Oceanic and Atmospheric Administration began updating forecasts and maps to refer to "Gulf of America", though it was unclear how the National Hurricane Center would refer to forecasts outside of the U.S. exclusive economic zone. The Library of Congress issued a proposal to replace scores of existing references to "Gulf of Mexico" and "Denali" in the Library of Congress Subject Headings, a controlled vocabulary used in library science.

== Reactions ==
=== Governments ===
President Claudia Sheinbaum of Mexico said that her country and the rest of the world would continue to refer to the Gulf of Mexico by its longstanding name. The Cuban government reportedly rejected the unilateral renaming. In the United Kingdom, the Permanent Committee on Geographical Names for British Official Use officially recommended Gulf of Mexico over "Gulf of America". The government of the United Kingdom reportedly has no plans to change official maps unless there is a change in common usage. In Poland, the Commission on Standardization of Geographical Names Outside the Republic of Poland (Polish: Komisja Standaryzacji Nazw Geograficznych poza Granicami Rzeczypospolitej Polskiej) ruled that the name of the gulf in Polish would remain Zatoka Meksykańska (literally "Mexican Gulf"). In Germany, the Permanent Committee on Geographical Names issued guidance that German-language publications should use the forms Mount McKinley (Denali) and Golf von Mexiko, noting that the names specified in the executive order are politically motivated. The Austrian Working Group for Cartographic Toponymy (Arbeitsgemeinschaft für Kartographische Ortsnamenkunde, AKO), issued a concurring statement.

In May 2025, the House of Representatives passed the Gulf of America Act, to codify the name "Gulf of America" in law, by a margin of 211 to 206. Representative Marjorie Taylor Greene of Georgia had introduced the resolution in January ahead of the executive order. It is uncertain whether the Senate will take up the bill. Congressional Democrats, including Senator Adam Schiff of California, had previously said that they are prioritizing other issues over President Trump's geographical renaming activities.

Alaska officials opposed the order to rename Denali to Mount McKinley. On February 7, 2025, the Alaska State Legislature passed a joint resolution urging the federal government to retain Denali as the mountain's official federal designation. The Alaska State Senate voted unanimously in favor of the resolution. On February 13, 2025, Alaska's U.S. senators, Lisa Murkowski and Dan Sullivan, both Republicans, co-sponsored legislation to officially redesignate the mountain as Denali.

The Louisiana Board of Elementary and Secondary Education approved a change to the state standard for social studies instruction to use "Gulf of America", starting in the 2025–2026 school year. The Oklahoma State Board of Education approved an updated social studies standard that required the use of "Gulf of America" and "Mount McKinley", as well as mandating teaching of the Bible and election denialism. Despite criticism from Democrats that Superintendent Ryan Walters had politicized the process, the legislature took no action and the standards went into effect for the 2025–2026 school year.

In Alabama, Governor Kay Ivey signed a law requiring all state and local government agencies, including schools and parks, to adopt "Gulf of America" in publications and communications and phase out use of "Gulf of Mexico". After Representative David Standridge introduced the bill in 2025, state officials expressed concern that renaming the Gulf of Mexico Energy Security Act of 2006 could risk federal interference in millions of dollars of oil and gas revenues that the act directs to state programs. The bill was filibustered at the end of the legislative session but was introduced the following year, passing the Alabama Senate on March 31, 2026. It takes effect October 1.

In Florida, Governor Ron DeSantis signed a pair of bills into law in response to the executive order, effective July 1, 2025. A "revisor's bill" replaces every occurrence of "Gulf of Mexico" in state law with "Gulf of America". The other bill requires state agencies to use "Gulf of America" in documents and maps. It also requires this name in any school instructional materials. In response, the Florida Department of Transportation removed signs for Gulf of Mexico Drive along Florida State Road 789 in Longboat Key, but the town commission voted unanimously to keep the street's name unchanged. Previously, Agriculture Commissioner Wilton Simpson had directed the Florida Department of Agriculture and Consumer Services to adopt "Gulf of America" in all the department's administrative rules and publications. State Senator Joe Gruters had also proposed renaming a portion of U.S. Route 41 currently known as Tamiami Trail to "Gulf of America Trail" but withdrew the proposal due to public criticism. The Republican Party of Florida promoted the renaming on a series of electronic billboards on highways along the Florida panhandle.

Officials in several other Republican-led states moved to align state usage with the executive order:

- Arkansas: Representative Aaron Pilkington introduced a resolution requiring all state agencies to adopt "Gulf of America", but the Arkansas House of Representatives voted down the resolution twice.
- Arizona: The Arizona State Legislature passed a bill by Representative Teresa Martinez that would require K-12 public schools to teach "Gulf of America" as the name of the gulf. The bill was vetoed by Democratic Governor Katie Hobbs.
- Iowa: A bill in the Iowa House of Representatives would require schools to use "Gulf of America" and Mount McKinley in classroom instruction and on any handouts given to students.
- Michigan: On May 7, 2025, Republicans in the state's House of Representatives passed a resolution that urges but does not require all public bodies, agencies, and departments in the state to use "Gulf of America" instead of "Gulf of Mexico". Rep. Matt Maddock initially put forth a bill to require state and local governments to make the change, but withdrew it due to a lack of support from House Democrats.
- Mississippi: Governor Tate Reeves said he would call it the "Gulf of America".
- Tennessee: Senator Bo Watson introduced a resolution that would encourage schoolteachers to use both "Gulf of America" and "Mount McKinley".
- Texas: Representative Briscoe Cain introduced a bill and joint resolution to change the gulf's name for state purposes, which would require an amendment to the Constitution of Texas.

In Russia, the executive order prompted Deputy Denis Bulanov of the Saratov Oblast Duma to propose renaming the Black Sea to "Russian Sea" domestically. Governor JB Pritzker of Illinois, a Democrat, released a video parodying the executive order by claiming to rename Lake Michigan back to Lake Illinois. Alluding to the renaming of the gulf, Lieutenant Governor Dan Patrick of Texas announced a plan to rebrand New York strip steak as "Texas strip". In New Jersey, State Senator Mike Testa introduced a bill to require the state government to refer to Delaware Bay as the "Bay of New Jersey".

=== News media ===
On January 23, 2025, the Associated Press (AP) announced that its wire reports would continue to refer to Gulf of Mexico while acknowledging "Gulf of America", but that they would begin referring to Mount McKinley instead of Denali. Maps and other graphics accompanying the reports would continue to label Gulf of Mexico for the time being. The AP Stylebook, which is the journalistic writing standard for news organizations worldwide, also permits Gulf and Gulf Coast. The New Yorker said they would follow AP guidance, while The Christian Science Monitor said they would use similar language. The Atlantic, Bloomberg News, HuffPost, the Los Angeles Times, The New York Times, Reuters, The Wall Street Journal, and The Washington Post stated that they would continue to refer to the gulf by its traditional name.

Conservative-leaning news outlets, including Fox News, Breitbart News, 1819 News, and Yellowhammer News, began to use "Gulf of America" without clarification. Axios, along with Gannett's USA Today and USA Today Network local newspaper chain, began to refer to the gulf by both names simultaneously. Some broadcast meteorologists have opted to call it simply "the Gulf".

Dissatisfied with the AP's decision, the White House indefinitely barred AP reporters from attending press events in the Oval Office or aboard Air Force One until the agency agrees to use "Gulf of America" in its style guide. On February 21, 2025, the AP sued the White House in Associated Press v. Budowich on constitutional grounds. The ban and other conflicts with the press have led to calls for solidarity and collective action among mainstream news organizations. Clay Calvert of the American Enterprise Institute juxtaposes the order and subsequent conflict with the AP against Executive Order 14149, noting the irony of coercing the press while decrying the Biden administration's coercion.

By the summer of 2025, press mentions of "Gulf of America" had declined substantially. Use of the name continued primarily in conservative media, as well as in trade magazines in the oil and gas industry and federally regulated industries. By August 2026, most conservative-leaning outlets had also begun to favor "Gulf of Mexico" again.

=== Technology industry ===
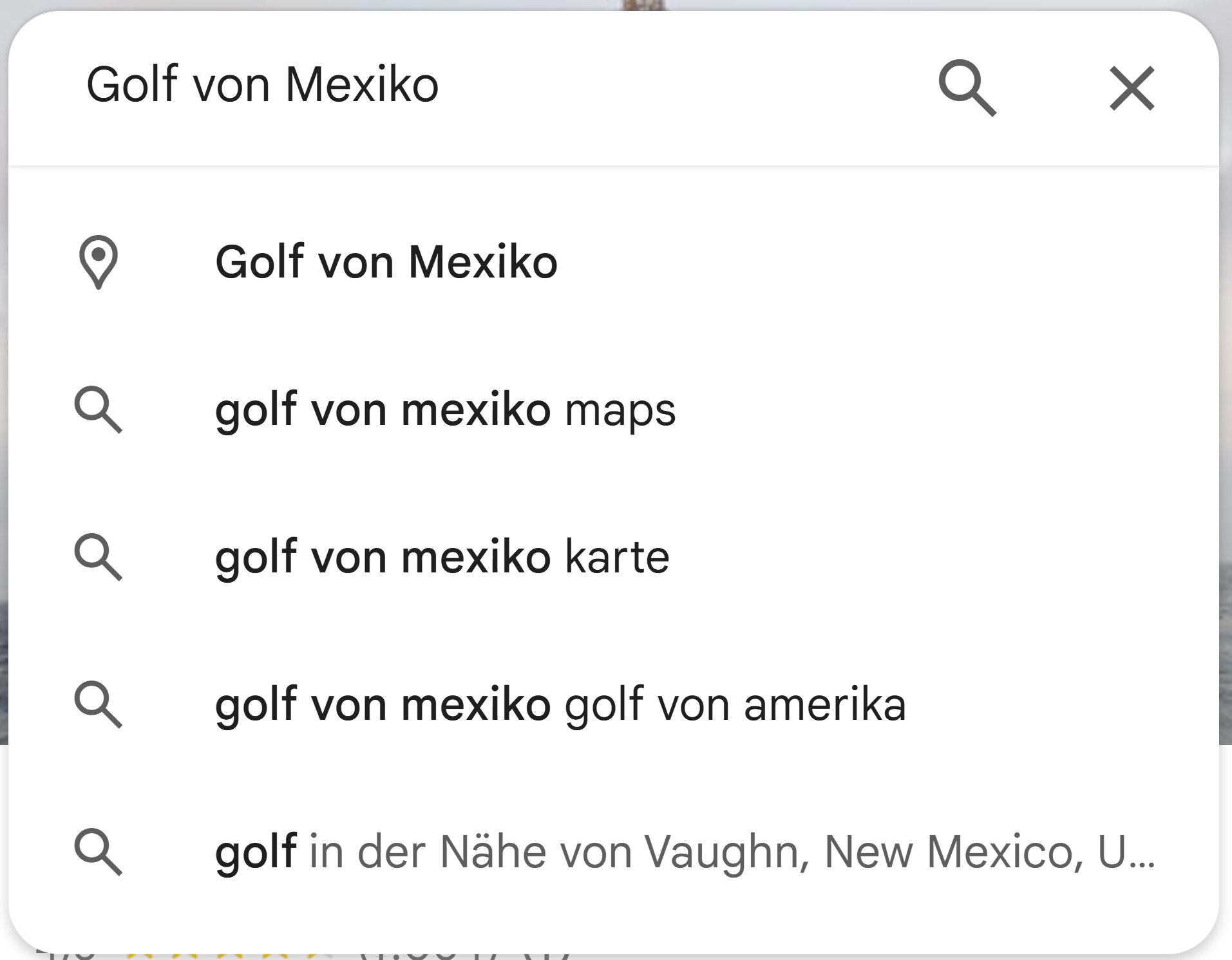
Google Maps presents translations of both names to users overseas, such as Golf von Mexiko with Golf von Amerika to German speakers in Germany.

Some major American map services voluntarily relabeled the gulf. Google added the United States and Mexico to an internal list of "sensitive" countries that require special consideration on maps, alongside China, Russia, Israel, Saudi Arabia, Iraq, and others. On January 27, 2025, the company announced that Google Maps and Google Earth would relabel both the Gulf of Mexico and Denali as soon as GNIS was updated. The gulf would appear as "Gulf of America" to users in the U.S., as Gulf of Mexico to users in Mexico, and as both names to users elsewhere, based on the Internet connection location. Google implemented the Gulf of America and Mount McKinley labels in early February, immediately following updates to GNIS.

Apple Maps and Bing Maps also updated references to "Gulf of America" and "Mount McKinley", following criticism from Republican officials. In Apple Maps, the gulf's label depends on the user's chosen locale setting rather than their physical location. Esri released a new series of basemaps for ArcGIS that are designed for U.S. government customers, labeling both "Mount McKinley" and "Gulf of America" and depicting boundaries as recognized by the U.S. State Department. The new basemaps will be shown to ArcGIS Online visitors who are located in the U.S. or use a U.S. locale, while others will continue to see more neutral international basemaps.

MapQuest did not rename the gulf on their main map, citing their own obsolescence in self-deprecating social media posts, but instead published a tool that allows users to personalize the gulf's label and share the resulting map on social media. Yandex stated that Yandex Maps would maintain the gulf's traditional name for its Russian-speaking users. Huawei stated that Petal Maps would maintain the traditional name as a competitive advantage against Google Maps.

In February 2025, President Claudia Sheinbaum of Mexico objected to Google's relabeling of the Gulf and had Foreign Secretary Juan Ramón de la Fuente send Google a letter threatening a civil lawsuit if they did not restore Gulf of Mexico to their maps, arguing that their depiction contradicts international law. She stated that the Legal Counsel of the Federal Executive was looking into the matter. The following month, her administration filed suit against Google's Mexican subsidiary before the Tenth Civil District Court in Mexico City (Spanish: Juzgado Décimo de Distrito en Materia Civil en la Ciudad de México), seeking damages, restoration of the Gulf of Mexico label across the company's products, and a clarification that the name "Gulf of America" only applies to portions of the continental shelf under U.S. control. However, Judge Eduardo León Sandoval dismissed the lawsuit on jurisdictional and standing grounds. In May, Sheinbaum confirmed that her administration has sued Google and implied a favorable ruling.

Mark Monmonier, the author of How to Lie with Maps, criticized Google's decision to acquiesce to what he described as President Trump's bullying. John Gruber argues that large technology companies cannot realistically ignore the name "Gulf of America", comparing the label to the falsely enlarged Diaoyu Islands that Chinese users see in Apple Maps due to government regulations, but he criticizes Apple and Google for erasing references to "Gulf of Mexico" and for not limiting the changes to U.S. users.

Internet users opposed to the Trump administration's actions reacted by review bombing Google Maps on the App Store and the gulf's entry in Google Maps, leading Google to disable reviews of the gulf. Vandals targeted the Mall of America in Minnesota and the Voice of America Center and Voice of America MetroPark in Ohio, briefly renaming them after Mexico. In Germany, Google Maps users added a raft of fake names of bodies of water, including six gulfs in the Bonn area alone, poking fun at the executive order, Google's compliance with it, and in some cases local crosstown rivalries.

In June 2025, telecommunications company Trump Mobile launched as an affiliate of The Trump Organization. The coverage map, borrowed from Ultra Mobile, quickly gained attention for its unaltered Gulf of Mexico label before the firm replaced it with a custom map.

=== Publishing industry ===
Among print publishers, Rand McNally stated that they would wait for the Department of the Interior to conduct legal and public review, eventually changing the label to "Gulf of America (Gulf of Mexico)" in their 2027 road atlases of North America. Japanese map and textbook publisher Teikoku Shoin said they would maintain the name Gulf of Mexico for the 2025–2026 school year and would reassess afterwards.

The Encyclopædia Britannica renamed their entries for Denali and the Gulf of Mexico to "Mount McKinley" and the "Gulf of Mexico / Gulf of America", while keeping "Gulf of Mexico" for all references to the gulf in other entries, after stating that they would retain "Gulf of Mexico" for their mostly international audience. An online merchant quickly capitalized on the executive order, selling out of Gulf of America-branded globes, maps, and other merchandise. Iranian publisher Gitashenasi issued a Persian language map of the United States that labels the gulf as both "Gulf of America" (خلیج امریکا) and "Gulf of Mexico" (خلیج مکزیک).

Cultural institutions have expressed concern that recent changes by the National Endowment for the Arts could jeopardize federal grants for works of literature that contradict the Trump administration's executive orders, including by referring to the Gulf of Mexico by its traditional name.

=== Petroleum industry ===
BP and Chevron, which have extensive leases in the gulf, have begun calling it the "Gulf of America", including retroactively, referring to the 2010 Deepwater Horizon oil spill as the "Gulf of America oil spill".

=== Fishing industry ===
Some seafood distributors in Louisiana are adding "Gulf of America" to their packaging to more clearly distinguish their products from similar products imported from Mexico and other countries.

=== Tourism industry ===
Tourism organizations in Alaska released statements opposing the renaming of Denali to Mount McKinley and committing to continue calling the mountain Denali.

The National Maritime Museum of the Gulf of Mexico in Mobile, Alabama, had no immediate plans to change their name, which was designated by an act of Congress. The city-owned museum rebranded back to this name in April 2024 at a cost of nearly $100,000, and there is concern about the cost of overhauling the entire museum's exhibits, some of which focus on Mexico. By 2026, they rebranded as the "National Maritime Museum of the Gulf".

=== Environmental movement ===
The Nature Conservancy changed their publications to refer to the gulf within U.S. territorial waters as "Gulf of America", retaining "Gulf of Mexico" elsewhere. The organization cited the executive order's effect on their partnerships with federal government agencies. At the time, the organization had at least $156 million in federal grants, including $45 million from the National Oceanic and Atmospheric Administration.

== Legacy ==
The order to rename Denali is symbolic of policies of retaliatory tariffs and American expansionism under Donald Trump, as President William McKinley was a champion of both policies during his time in the U.S. House of Representatives and as president.

Political commentator David Frum describes President Trump's renaming of the gulf as an attempt to project U.S. power, contrasting it with the historical European practice of mariners naming seas after destinations in less powerful countries on the opposite side, thus critiquing the action as a marker of decline. Jeffrey Abramson and Jack E. Davis, a noted author about the gulf's history, draw a parallel between the attempt to pressure the Associated Press and renamings by 20th century fascist leaders, warning of a possible precursor to scapegoating of minorities. Military historian Michael W. Charney describes the replacement of an indigenous reference with a European-derived name as an example of settler colonialism and compares the move to China's unilateral actions with respect to territorial disputes in the South China Sea. International security researcher Dalbir Ahlawat argues that the U.S. has emboldened China to pursue a more aggressive posture in the South China Sea, undermining the Biden administration's strategic partnerships with the Philippines, Indonesia, and Vietnam.

Trump has continued to refer to his Gulf renaming throughout his second term. In August 2026, amid an escalating trade war with Canada, he signed Executive Order 14422 (which references EO 14172) to rename Lake Ontario, which separates the two countries, to "Lake America" in federal agency usage.

== Polling ==
Opinion polls conducted since the executive order have ranked the renaming of the Gulf as one of the least popular actions of the second Trump administration.

Renaming the Gulf of Mexico to the Gulf of America (national polls)
Date (2025)	Pollster	Sample size (Note: Key: A – all adults; RV – registered voters; LV – likely voters; V – unclear)	Margin of error	Overall (Note: Key: Majority approval; Plurality approval; Tie; Plurality disapproval; Majority disapproval)			Democrats	Independents	Republicans
Date (2025)	Pollster	Sample size	Margin of error	Approve	Disapprove	Unsure	Approve	Approve	Approve
January 21–23	AtlasIntel	1,882 A	± 2%	32%	52%	16%	—N/a	—N/a	—N/a
January 22–24	Echelon Insights	1,024 LV	± 3.5%	26%	59%	15%	—N/a	—N/a	—N/a
January 24–26	Reuters/Ipsos	1,034 A	± 4%	25%	70%	5%	—N/a	—N/a	—N/a
January 27–February 5	Marquette University Law School	1,018 A	± 3.5%	29%	71%	—N/a	4%	16%	57%
February 2–4	The Economist/YouGov	1,604 A	± 3%	29%	54%	18%	10%	21%	54%
February 4–5	Cygnal	1,500 A	± 2.51%	20%	53%	6%	8%	18%	52%
February 13–18	Reuters/Ipsos	4,145 A	± 2%	30%	65%	5%	7%	25%	62%
February 16–18	The Economist/YouGov	1,603 A	± 3.3%	30%	52%	19%	12%	21%	55%
February 19–20	Harvard CAPS/Harris	2,443 RV	± 2.0%	39%	61%	—N/a	21%	31%	63%

Renaming the Gulf of Mexico to the Gulf of America (state polls)
Date (2025)	State	Pollster	Sample size	Margin of error	Overall		
Date (2025)	State	Pollster	Sample size	Margin of error	Approve	Disapprove	Unsure/other
January 27–30	New York	Siena College Research Institute	803 RV	± 4.2%	20%	60%	—N/a
February 5–14	Florida	University of North Florida	871 RV	± 3.7%	31%	58%	11%
February 13–17	New Hampshire	University of New Hampshire	1,444 A	± 2.6%	26%	54%	19%
February 13–17	Maine	University of New Hampshire	855 A	± 3.4%	20%	54%	25%
February 13–17	Vermont	University of New Hampshire	941 A	± 3.2%	18%	67%	15%
February 15–17	Illinois	M3 Strategies	750 RV	± 3.58%	30.1%	57.3%	27.2%

Alaska residents also opposed the order to rename Denali to Mount McKinley. An online poll by Alaska Public Media found that, among 600 respondents, about 95% preferred Denali over Mount McKinley.

== See also ==
- List of executive orders in the second presidency of Donald Trump
- First 100 days of the second Donald Trump presidency
- Persian Gulf naming dispute
- Sea of Japan naming dispute
- List of renamed places in the United States
- List of politically motivated renamings
