= Associated Press v. Budowich =

Federal court case, initiated 2025

Associated Press v. Taylor Budowich
- Seal of the United States Court of Appeals for the District of Columbia Circuit
- Court: United States Court of Appeals for the District of Columbia Circuit
- Full case name: Associated Press v. Taylor Budowich, in his official capacity as White House Deputy Chief of Staff; Karoline C. Leavitt, in her official capacity as White House Press Secretary; and Susan Wiles, in her official capacity as White House Chief of Staff
- Started: February 21, 2025; 20 months ago
- Docket nos.: 25-5109
- Defendants: Taylor Budowich, Karoline Leavitt, Susie Wiles
- Plaintiff: Associated Press

Case history
- Prior actions: Associated Press v. Budowich, 1:25-cv-00532 (D.D.C.), injunction and stay
- Appealed from: United States District Court for the District of Columbia

Court membership
- Judges sitting: Cornelia Pillard, Gregory G. Katsas, Neomi Rao

Keywords
- Freedom of the press; Due Process Clause

Associated Press v. Taylor Budowich, Karoline C. Leavitt, and Susan Wiles is a pending court case before a three-judge panel of the United States Court of Appeals for the District of Columbia Circuit concerning the decision by President Donald Trump's White House staff to bar the Associated Press (AP) from certain press events until the AP agrees to refer to the Gulf of Mexico as the "Gulf of America".

== Background ==
=== Associated Press ===
The AP counts many of the largest newspapers and broadcasters in the United States as members, and many more subscribe to the AP's wire reports. The AP Stylebook has been the American journalism industry's authoritative style guide for English grammar and terminology since the 1950s. Conservative allies of President Trump have criticized the Stylebook for bias over recent changes emphasizing inclusive language.

=== White House press corps ===
The White House press corps attends news briefings and other events at the White House to provide public visibility into executive branch activities. As part of its reporting on government affairs, the AP has participated in the press corps since its creation. In 1977, the U.S. Court of Appeals for the District of Columbia Circuit ruled in Sherrill v. Knight that the White House had a limited right to deny a press pass based on "an explicit and meaningful standard", provided that they "afford procedural protections". In 2018, during the first Trump administration, the White House revoked CNN reporter Jim Acosta's press pass, but a judge ordered him reinstated on due process grounds under the Fifth Amendment.

=== Naming the Gulf ===
President Trump signed Executive Order 14172 on January 20, 2025, directing federal agencies to designate the Gulf of Mexico as the "Gulf of America", a novel name for the waters, and Denali as "Mount McKinley". Private entities are not legally required to follow the federal use of these names. Three days later, the AP announced that their wire reports would continue to refer to Gulf of Mexico by its traditional name while acknowledging the Trump administration's choice to use "Gulf of America". Similarly, the AP Stylebook guidance is to refer to the original name and acknowledge the name Trump chose. The AP's rationale is that the wire reports are used by customers around the world who would be unable to intuit "Gulf of America" without further explanation. In a concession to the Trump administration, the AP simultaneously adopted "Mount McKinley" on the basis that the mountain's name is a domestic matter over which the federal government has clear authority.

=== Removal from press pool ===
On February 11, 2025, the White House Office indefinitely barred AP reporters from attending press pool events, such as press briefings in the Oval Office or aboard Air Force One. AP reporters would retain their press passes, and AP photographers would continue to have full access. Deputy Chief of Staff Taylor Budowich characterized the agency's continued references to the Gulf of Mexico as misinformation and announced that reporters from a different agency would take the AP's place. At a news conference, President Trump stated that the ban would stay in place until the AP agrees to use "Gulf of America" as the gulf's name. In a legal filing, the White House later confirmed that President Trump personally made the decision to revoke the AP's access.

AP executive editor Julie Pace condemned the ban as a violation of freedom of the press. The White House Correspondents' Association (WHCA) and Reporters Committee for Freedom of the Press petitioned the White House to reinstate the AP. More than 50 news organizations signed one or both petitions, including conservative-leaning outlets Fox News, Newsmax, and The Wall Street Journal. Reuters, Newsmax, the Foundation for Individual Rights and Expression, and the National Press Club also issued separate statements in support of the AP, criticizing the ban.

On February 25, 2025, the White House announced that the WHCA would no longer determine which outlets have access to the president. Breaking with tradition, they would continue to exclude the AP while making Bloomberg News and Reuters share a single seat for wire services, and the resulting two openings would go to outlets of the White House's choosing. On April 15, the White House eliminated the slot normally reserved for independent wire services in the press pool, affecting Bloomberg and Reuters along with the AP.

== Legal proceedings ==
On February 21, 2025, the AP sued Budowich, along with Press Secretary Karoline Leavitt and Chief of Staff Susie Wiles. The complaint alleges that, by singling out the AP for its editorial decisions, White House officials are violating the Constitution's First Amendment, which guarantees the freedom of the press, and the Due Process Clause of the Fifth Amendment. The case was filed in the U.S. District Court for the District of Columbia and assigned to Judge Trevor N. McFadden. In a hearing on February 24, 2025, Judge McFadden denied the AP's motion for a temporary restraining order. A hearing for a preliminary injunction was initially set for March 20, 2025. However, due to factual disputes, the preliminary injunction hearing was moved from March 20 to March 27, 2025, at 9:30 AM, with each side allowed up to two live witnesses and one hour for direct examination.

The White House Correspondents' Association and Reporters Committee for Freedom of the Press have filed amicus curiae briefs in support of the AP.

On March 3, 2025, the AP amended its complaint, nearly doubling the size of the document. The amended complaint leads with a quote from an unnamed White House advisor speaking to Axios on February 25: "The AP and the White House Correspondents Association wanted to fuck around. Now it's finding out time."

On April 8, 2025, Judge McFadden ruled that the White House must lift the access restrictions on the AP while the lawsuit moves forward, but stayed the ruling, allowing the government to file an emergency appeal to the United States Court of Appeals for the District of Columbia Circuit requesting an administrative stay.

On April 10, 2025, the defendants filed an emergency appeal to the U.S. Court of Appeals for the D.C. Circuit requesting a stay pending appeal on the preliminary injunction granted by Judge McFadden.

On June 6, 2025, a panel of the U.S. Court of Appeals for the Circuit of the District of Columbia, composed of judges Cornelia Pillard, Gregory G. Katsas, and Neomi Rao, granted in part a stay pending appeal, in a 2–1 decision. The majority found that the AP was not likely to succeed on the merits because it deemed that the Oval Office, Air Force One, Mar-a-Lago, Cabinet Room or other restricted spaces are areas where the First Amendment does not apply. It is one of the President's discretionary powers to grant access to these private spaces; therefore, Judge McFadden's preliminary injunction would curtail too much of such power as to amount to irreparable harm. However, the majority did not hold the same for the East Room, which does not share the same hallmarks as the other restricted spaces and for which irreparable harm could not be clearly identified. Judge Pillard dissented and would not have granted any stay pending appeal. Thus, the U.S. Court of Appeals upheld the preliminary injunction to restore AP access only to the extent concerning the East Room.

On July 22, 2025, the U.S. Court of Appeals denied unanimously the emergency petition filed by the AP on June 10, 2025, for en banc review of the three-judge panel's order granting in part the stay pending appeal.

== See also ==
- Legal affairs of the second Donald Trump presidency
- Donald Trump's conflict with the media
