= Tajik alphabets =

Various alphabets used to write the Tajik language

Tajik alphabets Алифбои тоҷикӣ الفبای تاجیکی Alifboyi tojikiy אלפבאי תאג׳יכי
- The coat of arms of the Tajik Autonomous Soviet Socialist Republic c. 1929, displaying examples of written Tajik in the Latin and Persian alphabets alongside Russian.
- Script type: Alphabet
- Period: c. 7th century CE – present
- Languages: Tajik, Bukharian

Related scripts
- Parent systems: Egyptian hieroglyphs: Phoenician alphabet; Greek alphabet (partly Glagolitic alphabet); Early Cyrillic alphabet; Russian alphabet; Tajik alphabets

ISO 15924
- ISO 15924: Cyrl (220), Cyrillic

Unicode
- Unicode alias: Cyrillic

The Tajik language has been written in three alphabets over the course of its history: the original Arabic-based Persian alphabet, a briefly used Roman-based orthography, and—more recently—a Cyrillic-based alphabet that is the official script in the Republic of Tajikistan.

The use of a specific alphabet generally corresponds with stages in history, with Arabic being used first for most of the time, followed by Latin, as a result of the Soviet takeover, for a short period and then Cyrillic, which remains the most widely used alphabet in Tajikistan. The Bukhori dialect spoken by Bukharan Jews traditionally used the Hebrew alphabet, but in modern times uses the Cyrillic variant.

== Political context ==
As with many post-Soviet states, the change in writing system and the debates surrounding it are closely intertwined with political themes. Although not having been used since the adoption of Cyrillic, the Latin script is supported by those who wish to bring the country closer to Uzbekistan, which has adopted the Latin‑based Uzbek alphabet. The Persian alphabet is supported by the devoutly religious, Islamists, and by those who wish to bring the country closer to Iran, Afghanistan, and their Persian heritage. As the de facto standard, the Cyrillic alphabet is generally supported by those who wish to maintain the status quo and not distance the country from Russia.

== History ==
As a result of the influence of Islam in the region, Tajik was written in the Persian alphabet up to the 1920s. Until this time, the language was not thought of as separate and simply considered a dialect of the Persian language. The Soviets began by simplifying the Persian alphabet in 1923, before moving to a Latin-based system in 1927. The Latin script was introduced by the Soviet Union as part of an effort to increase literacy and distance the, at that time, largely illiterate population, from the Islamic Central Asia. There were also practical considerations. The regular Persian alphabet, being an abjad, does not provide sufficient letters for representing the vowel system of Tajik. In addition, the abjad is more difficult to learn, each letter having different forms depending on the position in the word.

The Decree on Romanisation made this law in April 1928. The Latin variant for Tajik was based on the work by Turcophone scholars who aimed to produce a unified Turkic alphabet, despite Tajik not being a Turkic language. The literacy campaign was successful, with near-universal literacy being achieved by the 1950s.

During the russification processes in Central Asia, the Cyrillic script was introduced in the late 1930s. The alphabet remained Cyrillic until the end of the 1980s with the disintegration of the Soviet Union. In 1989, with the growth in Tajik nationalism, a law was enacted declaring Tajik the state language. In addition, the law officially equated Tajik with Persian, placing the word Farsi (the endonym for the Persian language) after Tajik. The law also called for a gradual reintroduction of the Perso-Arabic alphabet.

The Persian alphabet was introduced into education and public life, although the banning of the Islamic Renaissance Party in 1993 slowed down the adoption. In 1999, the word Farsi was removed from the state-language law. As of 2004 the de facto standard in use was the Cyrillic alphabet and as of 1996, only a very small part of the population could read the Persian alphabet.

== Variants ==
The letters of the major versions of the Tajik alphabet are presented below, along with their phonetic values. There is also a comparative table below.

=== Persian alphabet ===
The Persian alphabet (an abjad) is a modified variant of the Arabic alphabet used to write Tajik in Afghanistan and was formerly used in Tajikistan prior to Soviet rule. Letters پ, گ, چ, and ژ are additional letters used for sounds (i.e., /p, g, tʃ, ʒ/) not found in Arabic. The letters ض, ص, ث, ع, ح, ظ, and ط are used solely in words of Arabic origin.

Like the majority of Arabic-based orthographies, short vowels (e.g., /a, ɪ, ʊ/) are optionally written as vowel diacritics, and are generally not used in writing.

The Tajik alphabet in Persian
ح	چ	ج	ث	ت	پ	ب	ا
/h/	/tʃ/	/dʒ/	/s/	/t/	/p/	/b/	/ɔː/
ش	س	ژ	ز	ر	ذ	د	خ
/ʃ/	/s/	/ʒ/	/z/	/ɾ/	/z/	/d/	/χ/
ق	ف	غ	ع	ظ	ط	ض	ص
/q/	/f/	/ʁ/	/ʔ/	/z/	/t/	/z/	/s/
ی	ه	و	ن	م	ل	گ	ک
/j/	/h/	/v/	/n/	/m/	/l/	/ɡ/	/k/

=== Latin alphabet ===
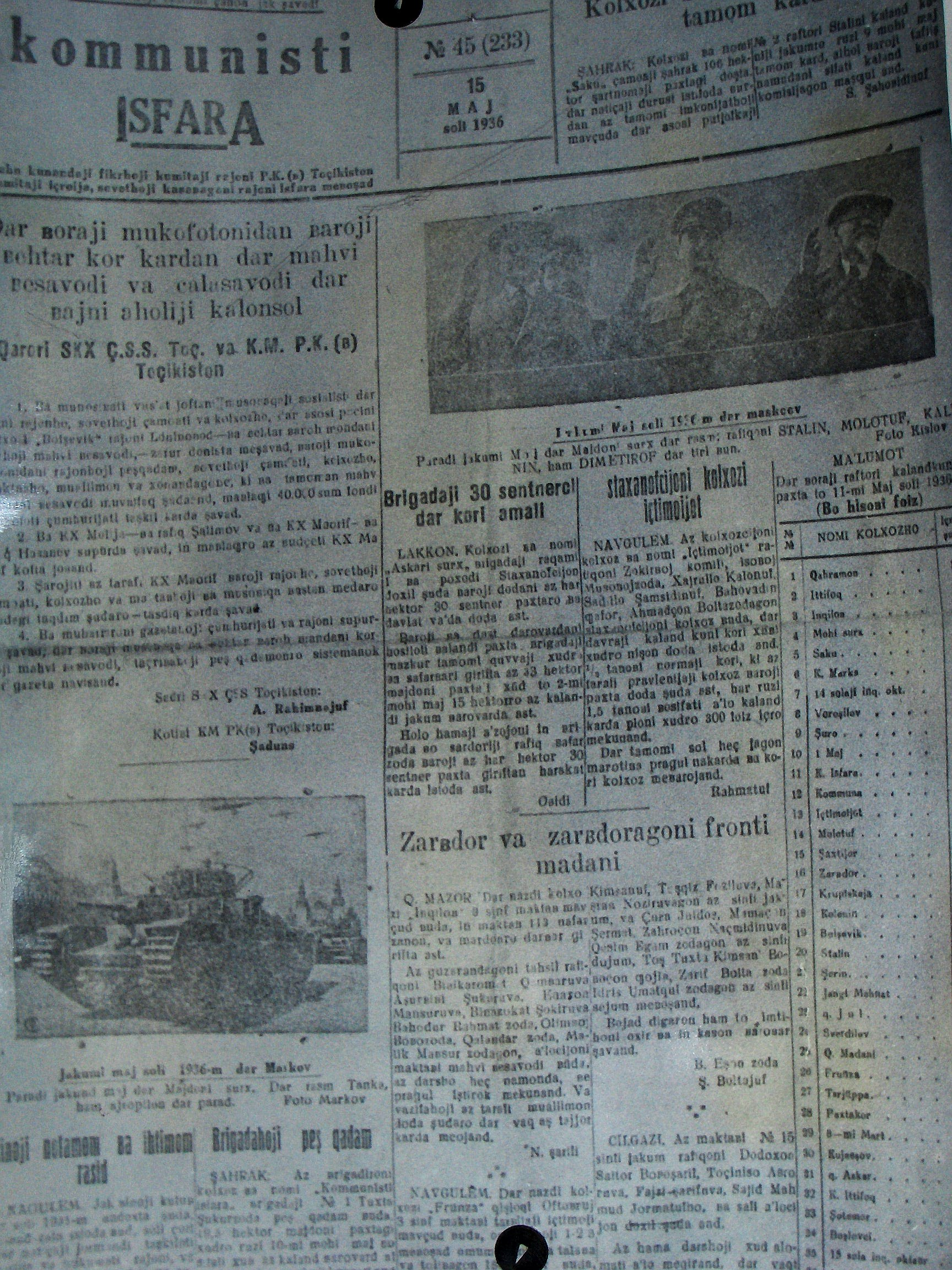
The front page of Kommunisti Isfara from 15 May 1936.

The Latin script was introduced after the Russian Revolution of 1917 in order to facilitate an increase in literacy and distance the language from Islamic influence. Only lowercase letters were found in the first versions of the Latin variant, between 1926 and 1929. A slightly different variant used by Bukharan Jews speaking a traditional dialect of Judeo-Persian included three extra characters for phonemes not found in other dialects: ⟨ů⟩, ⟨ə̧⟩ and ⟨ḩ⟩

The 1917 Latin Tajik alphabet
A a	B ʙ	C c	Ç ç	D d	E e	F f	G g	Ƣ ƣ
/æ/	/b/	/tʃ/	/dʒ/	/d/	/eː/	/f/	/ɡ/	/ʁ/
H h	I i	Ī ī	J j	K k	L l	M m	N n	O o
/h/	/i/	/ˈi/	/j/	/k/	/l/	/m/	/n/	/ɔː/
P p	Q q	R r	S s	Ş ş	T t	U u	Ū ū	V v
/p/	/q/	/ɾ/	/s/	/ʃ/	/t/	/u/	/ɵː/	/v/
X x	Z z	Ƶ ƶ	ʼ
/χ/	/z/	/ʒ/	/ʔ/

The character Ƣ is called Gha and represents the phoneme /ʁ/. The character is found in Yañalif in which most non-Slavic languages of the Soviet Union were written until the late 1930s. The Latin alphabet is not widely used today, although its adoption is advocated by certain groups.

=== Cyrillic alphabet ===
In the late 1930s, the Cyrillic script was introduced in the Tajik Soviet Socialist Republic, replacing the Latin script that had been used since the October Revolution. After 1939, materials published in the Persian alphabet were banned in the Soviet Union. The alphabet below was supplemented by the letters Щ and Ы in 1952.

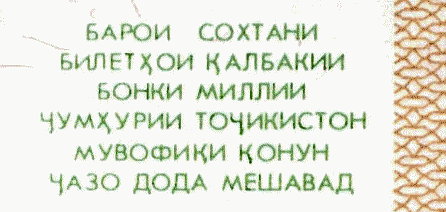
Text detail from the reverse of the 1 rouble note. The rouble was replaced in 2000 as a result of increasing inflation.

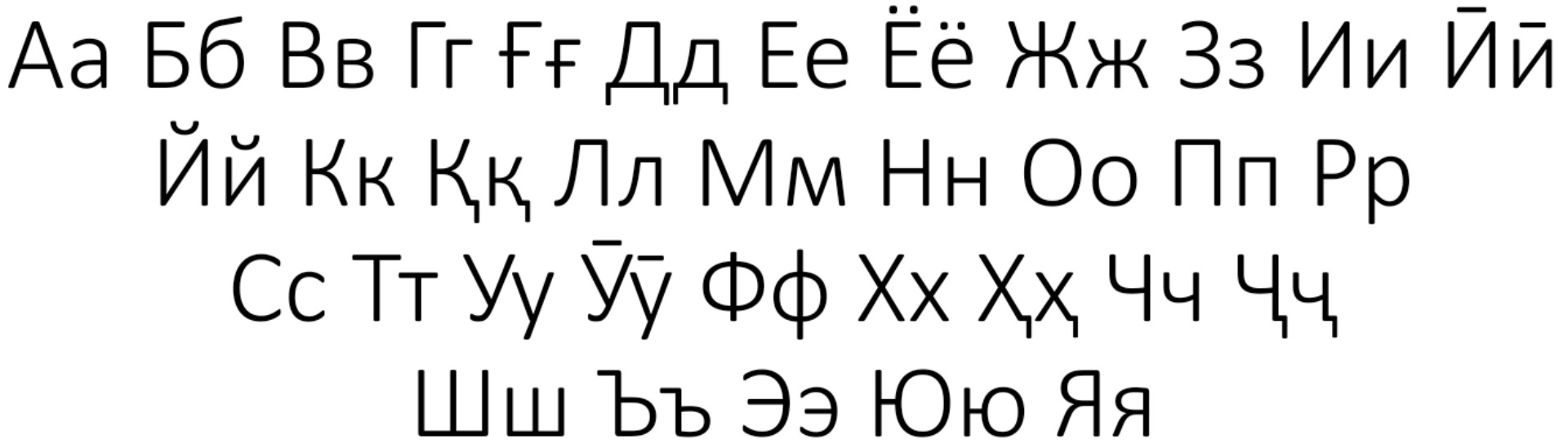
The current Tajik alphabet.

The Cyrillic Tajik alphabet
А а	Б б	В в	Г г	Ғ ғ
а	бе	ве	ге	ғе
/æ/	/b/	/v/	/ɡ/	/ʁ/
Д д	Е е	Ё ё	Ж ж	З з
де	е (йэ)	ё (йо)	же	зе
/d/	/jeː/, /eː/	/jɔː/	/ʒ/	/z/
И и	Ӣ ӣ	Й й	К к	Қ қ
и	и дароз	и кӯтоҳ	ке	қе
/i/	/iː/	/j/	/k/	/q/
Л л	М м	Н н	О о	П п
ле	ме	не	о	пе
/l/	/m/	/n/	/ɔː/	/p/
Р р	С с	Т т	У у	Ӯ ӯ
ре	се	те	у	ӯ
/ɾ/	/s/	/t/	/u/	/ɵː/
Ф ф	Х х	Ҳ ҳ	Ч ч	Ҷ ҷ
фе	хе	ҳе	че	ҷе
/f/	/χ/	/h/	/tʃ/	/dʒ/
Ш ш	Ъ ъ	Э э	Ю ю	Я я
ше	аломати сакта	э	ю (йу)	я (йа)
/ʃ/	/ʔ/	/eː/	/ju/	/jæ/

Before 1998, the Tajik Cyrillic alphabet contained 39 letters in the following order: а б в г д е ё ж з и й к л м н о п р с т у ф х ц ч ш щ ъ ы ь э ю я ғ ӣ қ ӯ ҳ ҷ (the 33 letters of the Russian alphabet and 6 additional letters as distinct letters at the end). The letters ц, щ and ы were used only in loanwords; the letter ь was used in the combinations ье, ьё, ью, ья (for /jeː, jɔː, ju, jæ/ after consonants) and in loanwords. The letters ц, щ, ы, and ь were officially dropped from the alphabet in the 1998 reform. Loanwords are now respelled using native Tajik letters: тс after vowels, otherwise с for ц; ш for щ; и for ы; ь is replaced by й in ье (also ьи, ьо in loanwords), dropped otherwise (including ьё, ью, ья). Along with the deprecation of these letters, the 1998 reform also changed the order of the alphabet, which now has the characters with diacritics following their unaltered partners, e.g. г, ғ and к, қ, etc. leading to the present order (35 letters): а б в г ғ д е ё ж з и ӣ й к қ л м н о п р с т у ӯ ф х ҳ ч ҷ ш ъ э ю я. In 2010, it was suggested that the letters е ё ю я might be dropped as well. The sound /eː/ is represented by э at the beginning of words (ex. Эрон, "Iran") and after vowels and by е after consonants. The sound combination /jeː/ is represented by е at the beginning of words and after vowels, otherwise by йе.

The alphabet includes a number of letters not found in the Russian alphabet:

Description	Г with bar	И with macron	К with descender	У with macron	Х with descender	Ч with descender
Letter	Ғ	Ӣ	Қ	Ӯ	Ҳ	Ҷ
Phoneme	/ʁ/	/ˈi/	/q/	/ɵː/	/h/	/dʒ/

During the period when the Cyrillicization took place, Ӷ ӷ also appeared a few times in the table of the Tajik Cyrillic alphabet.

=== Hebrew alphabet ===
The Hebrew alphabet is used for the Jewish Bukhori dialect primarily in Samarkand and Bukhara, Uzbekistan. Additionally, since 1940, when Jewish schools were closed in Central Asia, the use of the Hebrew Alphabet outside Hebrew liturgy fell into disuse and Bukharian Jewish publications such as books and newspapers began to appear using the Tajik Cyrillic Alphabet. Today, many older Bukharian Jews who speak Bukharian and went to Tajik or Russian schools in Central Asia only know the Tajik Cyrillic Alphabet when reading and writing Bukharian and Tajik.

The Tajik alphabet in Hebrew
גׄ	ג׳	ג	גּ	בּ	ב	אֵי	אִי	אוּ	אוֹ	אָ	אַ
/dʒ/	/tʃ/	/ʁ/	/ɡ/	/b/	/v/	/e/	/i/	/u/	/ɵ/	/ɔ/	/a/
מ ם	ל	כּ ךּ	כ ך	י	טּ	ט	ח	ז׳	ז	ו	ה	דּ	ד
/m/	/l/	/k/	/χ/	/j/	/t/	/s/	/ħ/	/ʒ/	/z/	/v/	/h/	/d/	/z/
תּ	ת	שׂ	שׁ	ר	ק	צ ץ	פּ ףּ	פ ף	ע	ס	נ ן
/t/	/s/	/s/	/ʃ/	/r/	/q/	/ts/	/p/	/f/	/ʔ/	/s/	/n/

=== Transliteration standards ===
The transliteration standards for the Tajik alphabet in Cyrillic into the Latin alphabet are as follows:

Cyrillic	IPA	ISO 9 (1995) ^{1}	KNAB (1981) ^{2}	WWS (1996) ^{3}	ALA-LC ^{4}	Allworth ^{5}	BGN/PCGN ^{6}	KSNG (2005)	Perso-Arabic equivalent
А а	/æ/	a	a	a	a	a	a	a	ا
Б б	/b/	b	b	b	b	b	b	b	ب
В в	/v/	v	v	v	v	v	v	v	و
Г г	/ɡ/	g	g	g	g	g	g	g	گ
Ғ ғ	/ʁ/	ġ	gh	gh	ḡ	gh	gh	ġ	غ
Д д	/d/	d	d	d	d	d	d	d	د
Е е	/jeː, eː/	e	e, ye	e	e	ye‐, ‐e‐	e	e	اى
Ё ё	/jɔː/	ë	yo	ë	ë	yo	yo	ë	یآ
Ж ж	/ʒ/	ž	zh	zh	ž	zh	zh	ž	ژ
З з	/z/	z	z	z	z	z	z	z	ز, ذ, ظ, ض
И и	/i/	i	i	i	i	i	i	i	اى
Ӣ ӣ	/ɘ/	ī	ī	ī	ī	ī	í	ī	يى
Й й	/j/	j	y	ĭ	j	y	y	j	ى
К к	/kʰ/	k	k	k	k	k	k	k	ک
Қ қ	/qʰ/	ķ	q	q	ķ	q	q	ķ	ق
Л л	/l/	l	l	l	l	l	l	l	ل
М м	/m/	m	m	m	m	m	m	m	م
Н н	/n/	n	n	n	n	n	n	n	ن
О о	/ɔː/	o	o	o	o	o	o	o	آ
П п	/pʰ/	p	p	p	p	p	p	p	پ
Р р	/r/	r	r	r	r	r	r	r	ر
С с	/s/	s	s	s	s	s	s	s	س, ث, ص
Т т	/tʰ/	t	t	t	t	t	t	t	ت, ط
У у	/u/	u	u	u	u	u	u	u	‌ۇ‌‌
Ӯ ӯ	/ɵː/	ū	ū	ū	ū	ū	ŭ	ū	و
Ф ф	/f/	f	f	f	f	f	f	f	ف
Х х	/χ/	h	kh	kh	x	kh	kh	h	خ
Ҳ ҳ	/h/	ḩ	h	ḩ	x	h	h	ḩ	ه, ح
Ч ч	/tʃʰ/	č	ch	ch	č	ch	ch	č	چ
Ҷ ҷ	/dʒ/	ç	j	j	č̦	j	j	ğ	ج
Ш ш	/ʃ/	š	sh	sh	š	sh	sh	š	ش
Ъ ъ	/ʔ/	'	'	'	'	"	'	'	ء, ع
Э э	/eː/	è	è, e	ė	è	e	ė	è	اى
Ю ю	/ju/	û	yu	i͡u	ju	yu	yu	û	يۇ
Я я	/jæ/	â	ya	i͡a	ja	ya	ya	â	يا

Notes to the table above:

1. ISO 9 — The International Organization for Standardization ISO 9 specification.
2. KNAB — From the placenames database of the Institute of the Estonian Language.
3. WWS — From World's Writing Systems, Bernard Comrie (ed.)
4. ALA-LC — The standard of the Library of Congress and the American Library Association.
5. Edward Allworth, ed. Nationalities of the Soviet East. Publications and Writing Systems (NY: Columbia University Press, 1971)
6. BGN/PCGN — The standard of the United States Board on Geographic Names and the Permanent Committee on Geographical Names for British Official Use.
7. KSNG – The standard of the Commission on Standardization of Geographical Names Outside the Republic of Poland (Komisja Standaryzacji Nazw Geograficznych poza Granicami Rzeczypospolitej Polskiej)

== Sample texts ==
Cyrillic	Latin	Persian	Hebrew	IPA	English translation
Тамоми одамон озод ба дунё меоянд ва аз лиҳози манзилату ҳуқуқ бо ҳам баробаранд. Ҳама соҳиби ақлу виҷдонанд, бояд нисбат ба якдигар бародарвор муносабат намоянд.	Tamomi odamon ozod ba dunyo meoyand va az lihozi manzilatu huquq bo ham barobarand. Hama sohibi aqlu vijdonand, boyad nisbat ba yakdigar barodarvor munosabat namoyand.	تمام آدمان آزاد به دنیا می‌آیند و از لحاظ منزلت و حقوق با هم برابرند. همه صاحب عقل و وجدانند، باید نسبت به یکدیگر برادروار مناسبت نمایند.	תמאם אדמאן אזאד בה דניא מיאינד ואז לחאז מנזלת וחקוק בא הם בראברנד. המה צאחב עקל וג׳דאננד، באיד נסבת בה יכדיגר בראדרואר מנאסבת נמאינד.	[tɐˈmɔmɪ ʔɔdɐˈmɔn ʔɐˈzad ba dʊnˈjɔ ˈmeʔojɐnd ʋa ʔaz lɪˈɦɔzɪ mɐnzɪˈlatʊ ɦʊˈquq bɔ ɦam bɐrɔˈbarɐnd ‖ ɦɐˈma sɔˈɦɪbɪ ˈʔaqlʊ ʋɪd͡ʒˈdɔnɐnd bɔˈjad nɪsˈbat ba jɐkdiˈgar bɐrɔdarˈʋɔr mʊnɔsɐˈbat nɐˈmɔjɐnd ‖]	All human beings are born free and equal in dignity and rights. They are endowed with reason and conscience and should act towards one another in a spirit of brotherhood.

Bukhari text	Cyrillic text	Latin text
דר מוקאבילי זולם איתיפאק נמאייד. מראם נאמה פרוגרמי פירקהי יאש בוכארייאן.	Дар муқобили зулм иттифоқ намоед. Муромнома – пруграми фирқаи ёш бухориён.	Dar muqobili zulm ittifoq namoyed. Muromnoma – prugrami firqayi yosh buxoriyon.

Cyrillic	vowel-pointed Persian	Persian	vowel-pointed Hebrew	Hebrew	Latin
Баниодам аъзои як пайкаранд, ки дар офариниш зи як гавҳаранд. Чу узве ба дард оварад рӯзгор, дигар узвҳоро намонад қарор. Саъдӣ	بَنی‌آدَم اَعضایِ یَک پَیکَرَند، که دَر آفَرینِش زِ یَک گَوهَرَند. چو عُضوی به دَرد آوَرَد روزگار، دِگَر عُضوها را نَمانَد قَرار. سَعدی	بنی‌آدم اعضای یک پیکرند، که در آفرینش ز یک گوهرند. چو عضوی به درد آورد روزگار، دگر عضوها را نماند قرار. سعدی	בַּנִי־אָדַם אַעְזָאי יַךּ פַּיְכַּרַנְד, כִּה דַר אָפַרִינִשׁ זִ יַךּ גַוְהַרַנְד. ג׳וּ עֻזְוֵי בַּה דַרְד אָוַרַד רוֹזְגָּאר דִגַּר עֻזְוְהָא רָא נַמָאנַד קַרָאר סַעְדִי.	בני־אדם אעזאי יך פיכרנד, כה דר אפרינש ז יך גוהרנד. ג׳ו עזוי בה דרד אורד רוזגאר דגר עזוהא רא נמאינד קראר סעדי.	Baniodam a’zoyi yak paykarand, ki dar ofarinish zi yak gavharand. Chu uzve ba dard ovarad ro‘zgor, digar uzvhoro namonad qaror. Sa’diy
Мурда будам, зинда шудам; гиря будам, xанда шудам. Давлати ишқ омаду ман давлати поянда шудам. Мавлавӣ	مُردَه بُدَم، زِندَه شُدَم؛ گِریَه بُدَم، خَندَه شُدَم. دَولَتِ عِشق آمَد و مَن دَولَتِ پایَندَه شُدَم. مَولَوی	مرده بدم، زنده شدم؛ گریه بدم، خنده شدم. دولت عشق آمد و من دولت پاینده شدم. مولوی	מֻרְדַה בֻּדַם זִנְדַה שֻׁדַם; גִּרְיַה בֻּדַם, כַנְדַה שֻׁדַם. דַוְלַתִ עִשְק אָמַד וּמַן דַוְלַתִ פָּאיַנְדַה שֻׁדַם. מַוְלַוִי	מרדה בדם זנדה שדם; גריה בדם, כנדה שדם. דולת עשק אמד ומן דולת פאינדה שדם. מולוי	Murda budam, zinda shudam; girya budam, xanda shudam. Davlati ishq omadu man davlati poyanda shudam. Mavlavi

== Comparative table ==
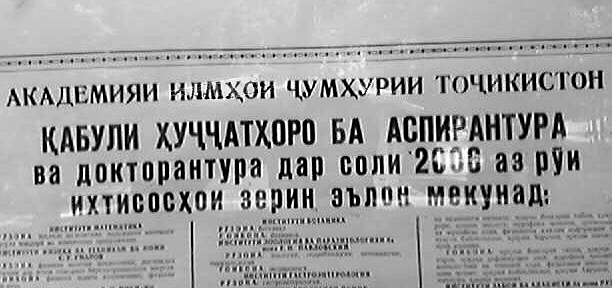
Advertisement in Cyrillic for the admission of the graduate students by the research institutes of the Tajik Academy of Sciences

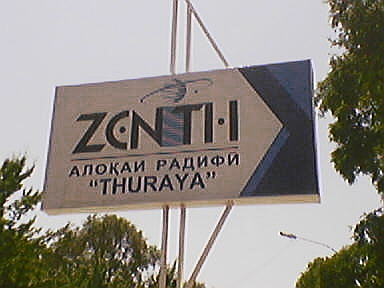
A biscriptal sign incorporating an English word, "Zenith", written in the Latin script, and Tajik written in Cyrillic

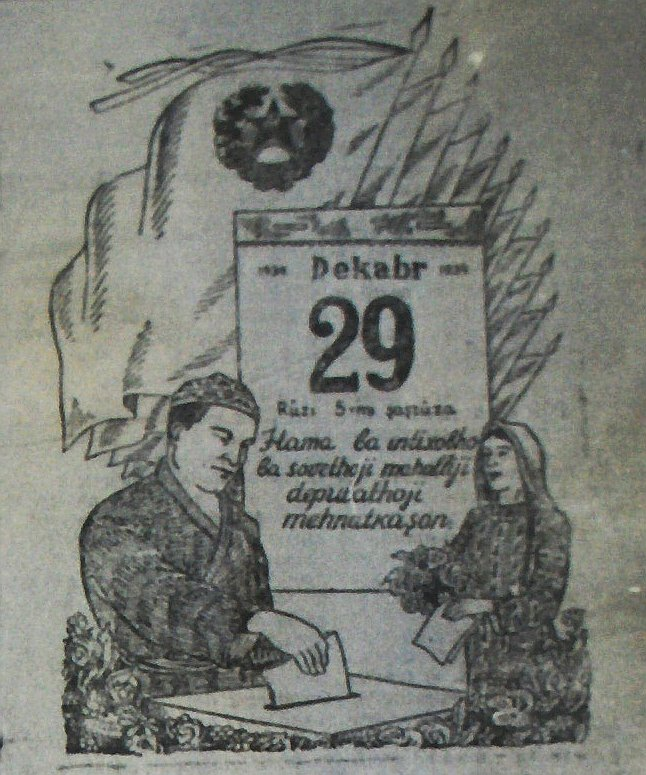
An illustration from Kommunisti Isfara, a newspaper published in Isfara in northern Tajikistan, inviting citizens to vote in the local labor councils elections on 29 December 1939. The text reads: Dekabr 29, Rūzi 5-m şaşrūza, Hama ba intixobho ba sovethoji mahalliji deputathoji mehnatkaşon.

A table comparing the different writing systems used for the Tajik alphabet. The Latin here is based on the 1929 standard, the Cyrillic on the revised 1998 standard, and Persian letters are given in their stand-alone forms.

Cyrillic	Latin	Persian	IPA	Examples
А а	A a	اَ، ـَ، ـَه	/a/	санг sang سَنگ /saŋg/ 'stone'
Б б	B b	ﺏ	/b/	барг barg بَرگ /barg/ 'leaf'
В в	V v	و	/v/	номвар nomvar نَاموَر /nɔmˈʋar/ 'renowned'
Г г	G g	گ	/ɡ/	гавҳар gavhar گَوهَر /gaʋˈhar/ 'gem'
Ғ ғ	Ƣ ƣ	ﻍ	/ʁ/	ғор ƣor غَار /ʁɔr/ 'cave'
Д д	D d	ﺩ	/d/	модар modar مَادَر /mɔˈdar/ 'mother'
Е е	E e	ای، ـی	/e/	шер şer شیر /ʃer/ 'lion'
Ё ё	Jo jo	یا	/jɔ/	дарё darjo دَریَا /darˈjɔ/ 'sea'
Ж ж	Ƶ ƶ	ژ	/ʒ/	жола ƶola ژَالَه /ʒɔˈla/ 'hail'
З з	Z z	ﺯ، ﺫ، ﺽ، ﻅ	/z/	замин zamin زَمِین /zaˈmin/ 'earth'
И и	I i, Ji ji	اِ، ـِ، ـِه؛ اِیـ، ـِیـ	/i/	Микоил Mikojil مِیکَائِیل /mikɔˈil/ 'Michael'
Ӣ ӣ	Ī ī	ـِی	/í/	зебоӣ zebojī زیبَائِی /zebɔˈi/ 'beauty'
Й й	J j	ی	/j/	май maj مَی /maj/ 'May'
К к	K k	ک	/kʰ/	кадом kadom کَدَام /kaˈdɔm/ 'which'
Қ қ	Q q	ﻕ	/q/	қадам qadam قَدَم /qaˈdam/ 'step'
Л л	L l	ﻝ	/l/	лола lola لَالَه /lɔˈla/ 'tulip'
М м	M m	ﻡ	/m/	марг marg مَرگ /marg/ 'death'
Н н	N n	ﻥ	/n/	нон non نَان /nɔn/ 'bread'
О о	O o	آ، ـا	/ɔ/	орзу orzu آرزُو /ɔrˈzu/ 'wish'
П п	P p	پ	/pʰ/	панҷ panç پَنج /pandʒ/ 'five'
Р р	R r	ﺭ	/ɾ/	ранг rang رَنگ /raŋɡ/ 'colour'
С с	S s	ﺱ، ﺙ، ﺹ	/s/	сар sar سَر /sar/ 'head'
Т т	T t	ﺕ، ﻁ	/tʰ/	тоҷик toçik تَاجِیک /tɔˈdʒik/ 'Tajik'
У у	U u	اُ، ـُ؛ اُو، ـُو	/u/	дуд dud دُود /dud/ 'smoke'
Ӯ ӯ	Ū ū	او، ـو	/ɵ/	хӯрдан xūrdan خوردَن /χɵrˈdan/ 'to eat'
Ф ф	F f	ﻑ	/f/	фурӯғ furūƣ فُروغ /fuˈrɵʁ/ 'lustre'
Х х	X x	ﺥ	/χ/	хондан xondan خوَاندَن /χɔnˈdan/ 'to read'
Ҳ ҳ	H h	ﺡ، ه	/h/	ҳар har هَر /har/ 'each'
Ч ч	C c	چ	/tʃʰ/	чи ci چِی /tʃi/ 'what'
Ҷ ҷ	Ç ç	ﺝ	/dʒ/	ҷанг çang جَنگ /dʒaŋɡ/ 'war'
Ш ш	Ş ş	ﺵ	/ʃ/	шаб şab شَب /ʃab/ 'night'
Ъ ъ	'	ء، ﻉ	/ʔ/	таъриф ta’rif تَعرِیف /taʔˈrif/ 'definition'
Э э	E e	ای، ـی	/e/	Эрон Eron ایرَان /eˈrɔn/ 'Iran'
Ю ю	Ju ju	یُ, یُو	/ju/	июн ijun اِیُون /iˈjun/ 'June'
Я я	Ja ja	یَ, یَه	/ja/	ягона jagona یَگَانَه /jaɡɔˈna/ 'unique'

== See also ==
- Language planning – Deliberate effort to influence languages or their varieties within a speech community
- Official script – Designated writing system of a jurisdiction
- Tajik Braille – Braille equivalent of the Cyrillic script
