= Trump and the media =

Trump and the media may refer to:

- Social media use by Donald Trump
- Donald Trump's conflict with the media
