= National Maritime Museum of the Gulf of Mexico =

The National Maritime Museum of the Gulf
- Established: September 26, 2015
- Location: Mobile, Alabama, US
- Coordinates: 30.6884°N 88.0375°W
- Type: Interactive Maritime Museum
- Accreditation: 2016 Alabama Attraction of the Year
- Director: Karen Poth
- Parking: On site
- Website: https://nmmog.org

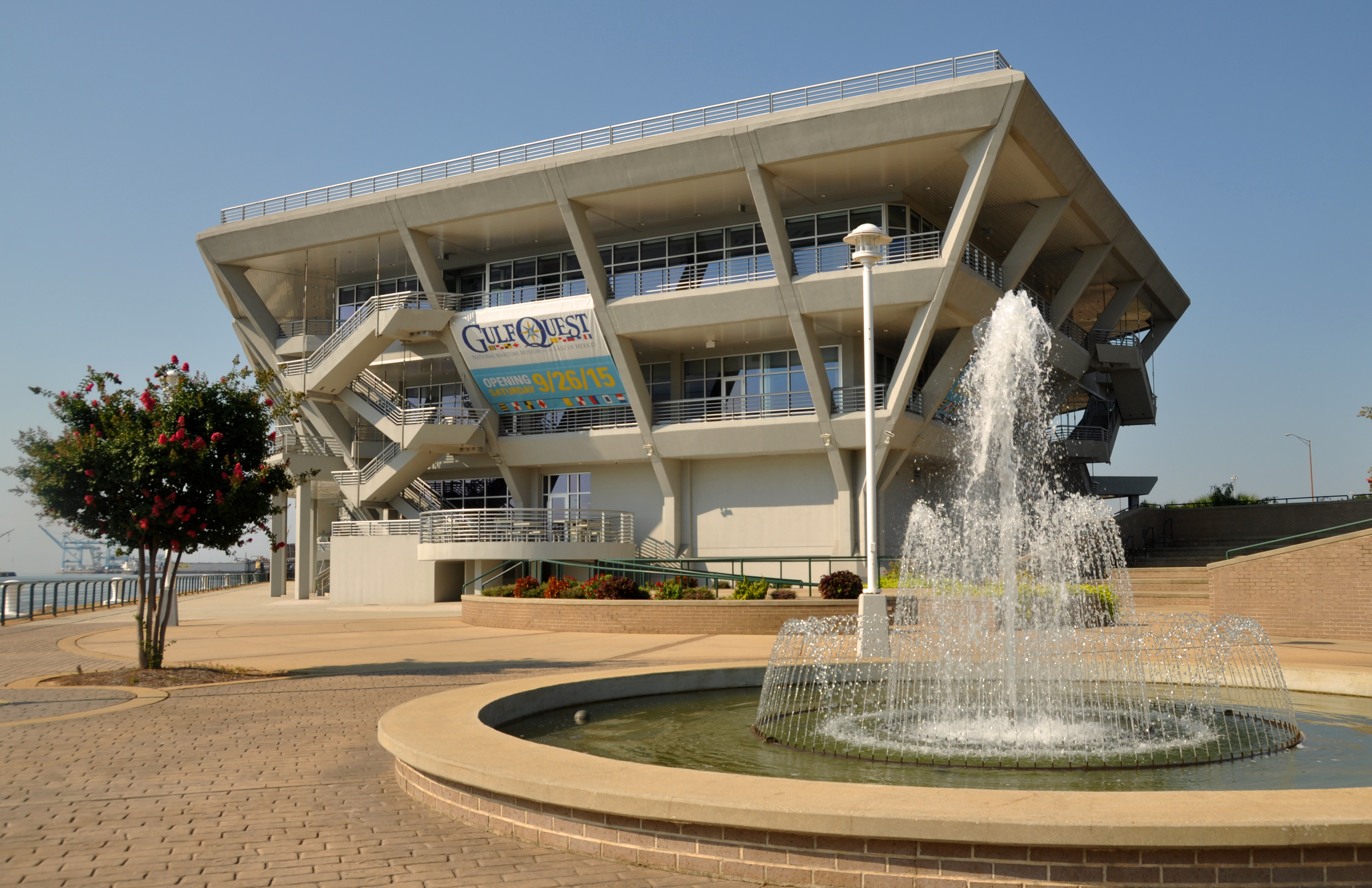
National Maritime Museum of the Gulf of Mexico

The National Maritime Museum of the Gulf (formerly The National Maritime Museum of the Gulf of Mexico, and before that GulfQuest) opened on September 26, 2015, is a non-profit interactive maritime museum dedicated to the maritime heritage and culture of the Gulf of Mexico. The 120,000 square foot museum, located on the riverfront in downtown Mobile, Alabama, is designed to look as if it were a ship headed into Mobile Bay and the Gulf of Mexico. The museum features 90 interactive exhibits, simulators, theaters and artifact displays, complemented by artifacts and memorabilia displayed throughout "multiple decks" inside a full-sized replica of a container ship, displayed as if dockside. GulfQuest also features a museum store, a museum café and several event spaces.

Named "Attraction of the Year" for 2016 by the Alabama Department of Tourism, The National Maritime Museum of the Gulf of Mexico is the only fully interactive maritime museum in the world and the only maritime museum dedicated to the Gulf of Mexico. The National Maritime Museum of the Gulf of Mexico presents the history, culture, marine science and maritime traditions of the Gulf of Mexico region for visitors of all ages.

== History ==
During the 1990s, City of Mobile and Alabama state leaders formed a non-profit organization to create a maritime museum to serve as an educational resource for the region and the nation.

During the planning portion, then-current Mobile Mayor Mike Dow campaigned for the museum to be the centerpiece of "Mobile Landing", a downtown waterfront development meant to restore public access to the Mobile waterfront.

"Mobile Landing" would eventually become home to the Alabama Cruise Terminal, the Arthur C. Outlaw Convention Center, and Cooper Riverside Park.

The construction of the museum began during Sam Jones' tenure as Mobile's Mayor. Construction ran from 2010 through 2015 with installation of the museum's exhibits completed in the summer of 2015.

The museum closed temporarily to the general public in November 2016. The decision to close the museum was made by Mobile Mayor Sandy Stimpson, who wanted the non-profit board to assume an advisory role (rather than direct management of the museum). With staffing provided by the city, the museum reopened in February 2017. Karen Poth is the Museum's current Executive Director. She is the fourth Executive Director to hold this role since the Museum's opening in 2016.

In April 2024, the museum changed its name from GulfQuest back to the National Maritime Museum of the Gulf of Mexico, its Congressionally designated name, at a cost of nearly $100,000. In February 2025, the Mobile City Council unanimously approved $740,000 in payments to the museum to settle its outstanding debt related to existing exhibits. The museum plans to open an exhibit about Jimmy Buffett in the fall of 2026, as well as an interactive exhibit about the Mobile–Tensaw River Delta the following year, using a grant of $2.3 million from the Gulf of Mexico Energy Security Act of 2006. The museum's board and the city have no immediate plans to rebrand the museum again to refer to the "Gulf of America" following Executive Order 14172. A bill before the Alabama House of Representatives would require the museum to use "Gulf of America" going forward if signs, exhibits, and other materials are replaced but would still allow it to use existing resources that use "Gulf of Mexico".

== Building ==
The National Maritime Museum of the Gulf of Mexico is a 120,000 square foot building designed to look as if it were a ship leaving port headed into Mobile Bay and the Gulf of Mexico. Because the technology behind container ships originated in Mobile, Alabama, and had a dramatic impact on the shipping and maritime industry, GulfQuest's board of directors decided to put a full-sized replica of a container ship inside the museum to house most of the museum's 90 exhibits. The replica (dubbed The SS McLean), surrounded by water and made to look like it's floating, has interior walkways resembling those on large ships with the museum's "Seagoing Slang" displayed throughout each level.

=== SS McLean ===
At the heart of the museum is a full-sized replica of a container ship named the SS McLean, commemorating Malcom McLean and Mobile, Alabama's role in the early development of containerization, a revolutionary system that minimized cargo handling and shipping costs.

In 1955, Malcom McLean, a trucking entrepreneur from North Carolina, acquired Waterman Steamship Corporation, a Mobile-based firm, to test his idea of shipping cargo in large containers that could be moved fully loaded from land to sea, and from sea to land. On April 26, 1956, the world's first container ship, Ideal-X, made its maiden voyage from New Jersey to Houston with 58 containers on board. McLean's plan reduced the cost of loading and discharging cargo from $5.83 a ton to only 15.8 cents a ton.

McLean's first three container ships were "spar deck" tankers, capable of carrying containers topside only.

The building also includes a gift shop and Mobile's only waterfront restaurant, both with a nautical theme.

== Exhibits ==
Designed to resemble a ship leaving port, NMMOG is a museum with an educational focus with hands-on exhibits, theaters, simulators and displays.

The exhibits featured at NMMOG include ones that focus on hurricanes, shipwrecks, offshore drilling, sailing, and more.

Some of the notable 90-plus interactive exhibits include:

=== Take the Helm ===
A panoramic pilot simulator identical to those used to train professional boat pilots. Visitors choose a vessel and try their way in navigating through the Gulf and into Mobile's port. The images displayed in this simulator are designed to represent real locations along the Port of Mobile.

=== Pelican Girls ===
The exhibit features images depicting a story of two French woman who sailed from Paris to Mobile on the ship Pelican in 1704 where they were to wed French-Canadian settlers.

=== The Great Gulf Challenge ===
An interactive game where visitors take on leadership roles to help restore the delicate balance of the Gulf of Mexico through environmental and economic choices while facing realistic disasters.

=== Ocean Planet Theater ===
GulfQuest's Science on a Sphere, a six-foot diameter planet Earth suspended in midair showing three-dimensional visualizations of Earth, hurricanes, global shipping traffic, and much more.

=== Seagoing Slang ===
Located on the rampways on either side of the container ship are common sayings with maritime origins highlighted on individual panels. Sayings like "All in a Day's Work", "Clean Bill of Health", "Cup of Joe", "Out of the Blue", "Lay of the Land" and more are defined and their maritime origins revealed.

== Awards ==
The Alabama Department of Tourism named GulfQuest / National Maritime Museum of the Gulf of Mexico the state's 2016 "Tourism Attraction of the Year." The project was recognized with the "Downtown Innovation Award" from the Downtown Mobile Alliance/Main Street Mobile in 2015. In addition, Tony Zodrow, GulfQuest's founding Executive Director, was named "Maritime Person of the Year" by the Propeller Club of the Port of Mobile in 2016.

== See also ==
- List of maritime museums in the United States
