= Michael Velchik =

American lawyer

- Education: Harvard University (BA, JD)
- Occupation: Lawyer
- Known for: Senior Counsel at the United States Department of Justice (Trump administration, 2025)

Michael Velchik is an American lawyer, currently serving as senior counsel at the US Department of Justice's civil division. During the first Trump Administration, Velchik served as deputy associate counsel to the president.

== Early life and education ==
Velchik is from Oakton, Virginia, and attended St. Albans School, graduating in 2008. He later attended Harvard University, receiving his Bachelor of Arts in 2012 and his Juris Doctor in 2016. Velchik was a member of the Harvard men's lightweight rowing team.

As an undergraduate senior in 2011, he submitted a Latin paper from the perspective of Adolf Hitler for an assignment. Velchik was subsequently asked by his professor to redo the paper. Velchik delivered the Latin address at Harvard's 2012 commencement ceremony.

Prior to entering law school, in an email to a friend, Velchik described Hitler's autobiography Mein Kampf as "my favorite book I’ve read this year" according to correspondence obtained by The Boston Globe.

== Career ==
=== Second Trump administration ===
In 2025, during the second Trump Administration, Velchik joined the Department of Justice as senior counsel.

In May 2025, he defended the administration's invocation of the Alien Enemies Act against illegal immigrants.

==== Harvard v. Department of Health and Human Services and Harvard Faculty Chapter v. U.S. Department of Justice ====
Velchik is one of the leading figures in the administration's actions against Harvard University, which included cancelling federal grants and contracts on the basis of the university's alleged violations of civil rights law by purported fostering of antisemitism on campus. Velchik was the sole lawyer arguing in Boston against the university and American Association of University Professors in July 2025, where he claimed the case was primarily a contract dispute and should be heard before the Federal Court of Claims, adding that the administration had the right to cancel funding as Harvard had displayed "a wanton indifference to antisemitism."

In September 2025, District Judge Allison D. Burroughs ruled the Trump Administration had unlawfully cancelled nearly $3 billion in grants to Harvard University, ruling the administration had used accusations of antisemitism as a "smokescreen" to attack the school. The ruling determined the administration's had violated Harvard's First Amendment and due process rights. In an April 2026 brief filed with the First Circuit US Court of Appeals in Boston, Velchik argued "the Government is not required to continue giving taxpayer dollars to universities that have demonstrated deliberate indifference to antisemitic conduct and discrimination on campus."

==== U.S. Postal Service v. California ====
Velchik defended the March 31, 2026 Executive Order 14399, "Ensuring Citizenship Verification and Integrity in Federal Elections" rule regulating mail-in ballots before US district judge Indira Talwani. Talwani questioned Velchik on the government's preparedness to implement the rule, asking "As you sit here today, you can’t tell me the government has a program ready to go?”, to which Velchik replied that the US Postal Service would "fully implement the rule" published in August 2026. Talwani subsequently issued a temporary restraining order blocking the rule, and the Trump administration appealed to the US Supreme Court.

==== CNN et al. v. Trump ====
In September 2026, Velchik signed as Trump’s lawyer at the Department of Justice defending his media ban on CNN, Politico, and MS NOW in CNN et al. v. Trump. In a DOJ filing submitted on September 22, 2026, Velchik wrote that the outlets "failed to maintain basic minimum 'standards of professionalism and decorum expected of those given access to the White House Complex,'" including, "publishing sensitive or classified information." Velchik argued that these allegations gave the White House the right to bar these outlets from the complex, writing, "After all, access to the White House is a privilege — not a right."

In a September 23, 2026 hearing, Velchik argued the president should be able to "take immediate action" to protect national security by quickly banning the reporters from White House grounds. Judge Timothy J. Kelly closed the hearing without issuing a ruling.
