= CNN v. Trump =

2018 United States lawsuit

- Court: United States District Court for the District of Columbia
- Full case name: Cable News Network, Inc. and Abilio James Acosta v. Donald J. Trump, in his official capacity as President of the United States; John F. Kelly, in his official capacity as Chief of Staff to the President of the United States; William Shine, in his official capacity as Deputy Chief of Staff to the President of the United States; Sarah Huckabee Sanders, in her official capacity as Press Secretary to the President of the United States; the United States Secret Service; Randolph Alles, in his official capacity as Director of the United States Secret Service; and John Doe, Secret Service Agent, in his official capacity
- Decided: November 16, 2018 (temporary restraining order issued); November 19, 2018 (dismissed by plaintiff)
- Defendants: Donald J. Trump; John F. Kelly; William Shine; Sarah Sanders; United States Secret Service; Randolph Alles; John Doe, Secret Service Agent
- Counsel for plaintiffs: Theodore Boutrous
- Plaintiffs: Cable News Network, Inc. Abilio James Acosta
- Citation: 1:18-cv-02610-TJK

Court membership
- Judge sitting: Timothy J. Kelly

CNN v. Trump is a lawsuit filed on November 13, 2018, in the United States District Court for the District of Columbia. The plaintiffs are the Cable News Network (CNN) and their chief White House correspondent Jim Acosta, and the defendants are members of the Donald Trump administration and United States Secret Service. Citing Sherrill v. Knight, Pursuing America's Greatness v. Federal Election Commission, and Elrod v. Burns, the suit argued that the White House wrongfully revoked Acosta's press credentials in violation of the First Amendment right to freedom of the press and Fifth Amendment right to due process, respectively; and, additionally citing federal regulations (namely, "Fed. R. Civ. P. 65(a) and Local Rule 65.1"), the suit successfully sought immediate relief from damage to CNN and Acosta by way of a temporary restraining order for the return of Acosta's press pass. CNN dropped the suit on November 19.

== Background ==
On November 7, 2018, the day after the midterm elections, President Trump held a press conference at the White House. Jim Acosta, White House correspondent for CNN, asked Trump about his use of the word invasion to describe the Central American migrant caravans. Trump then answered he wants the immigrants to come in legally and argued with Acosta (himself the son of a Cuban American refugee) about his position on the issue. While asking his follow-up question, Trump refused to answer and cut Acosta off, by stating "Honestly, I think you should let me run the country, you run CNN, and if you did it well, your ratings would be much better" before signaling to a White House intern to take the microphone, and calling on someone else. Acosta then refused to give up the mic and tried to ask a question regarding the Special Counsel investigation into alleged Russian interference in the 2016 United States elections, but Trump repeated "That's enough" three more times before the intern tried to take the microphone from him. Acosta resisted, and Trump followed by telling Acosta to "put down the mic."

After, when the intern took the microphone and gave it to another reporter, Acosta sat down, and Trump said "CNN should be ashamed of itself having you working for them. You are a rude, terrible person. You shouldn't be working for CNN." Trump then claimed Acosta has mistreated Sarah Sanders in the past. After Trump began taking questions from NBC News reporter Peter Alexander, who came to Acosta's defense and Trump claimed to not like either, Acosta then stood back up and mentioned that CNN was sent pipe bombs by a Trump supporter, to which Trump replied "When you report fake news, which CNN does a lot, you are the enemy of the people".

Later that day while he attempted to do a live report outside the White House, an unidentified Secret Service agent confiscated Acosta's press pass. Acosta recorded the incident on his cell phone, saying "This is Jim Acosta. I am in front of the White House. Secret Service officer is asking for my hard pass. Obviously, no hard feelings to the officer, but I am now giving my hard pass to the Secret Service." The next day, White House Press Secretary Sarah Sanders defended their actions, claiming Acosta had "placed his hands" on the intern.

== Timeline of litigation ==
A hearing was held on November 14, 2018. Presiding Judge Timothy Kelly indicated that he would give his ruling on the following day, November 15. On that date, Judge Kelly postponed his ruling until the following day, November 16. Several media organizations filed amicus briefs in support of CNN, including Fox News, NBC News, The Associated Press, Bloomberg News, Gannett Company, The New York Times, Politico, USA Today, The Washington Post, the Reporters Committee for Freedom of the Press, First Look Media, BuzzFeed News, and the White House Correspondents' Association; as well as the Institute for Constitutional Advocacy and Protection at the Georgetown University Law Center. One America News Network filed an amicus brief in support of the Trump administration, the only news agency to do so.

Transcript of Judge Kelly's order from the November 16 hearing

On Friday, November 16, Judge Kelly ordered that Acosta's press pass be restored for 14 days. The judge said in his ruling that Acosta was deprived of his Fifth Amendment rights of due process, because Acosta had not been given prior notice or the chance to rebut. Judge Kelly declined to rule on the First Amendment claim. In response, Press Secretary Huckabee Sanders claimed the court made it clear there was no First Amendment right to access the White House, although Judge Kelly had stated the ruling did not address questions about First Amendment issues.

Intending to request a preliminary injunction for Acosta to retain his press pass, which was to last longer than the existing temporary restraining order that was to expire November 30; and, after the White House sent Acosta a letter which said that his behavior "violated the basic standards governing [news conferences], and is, in our preliminary judgment, sufficient factual basis to revoke your hard pass"; on November 19, CNN's lawyer asked Judge Kelly for an emergency hearing "for the week of November 26, 2018, or as soon thereafter as possible." The White House responded in a later letter saying, "Having received a formal reply from your counsel to our letter of November 16, we have made a final determination in this process: your hard pass is restored. Should you refuse to follow these rules in the future, we will take action in accordance with the rules set forth above. The President is aware of this decision and concurs." CNN afterward signaled it will drop the lawsuit.

== Aftermath ==
On November 19, the White House outlined four rules for reporters during press conferences:

1. Reporters will ask a single question and then will yield the floor to other journalists.
2. Follow-up questions will be permitted at the discretion of the president or other White House officials taking questions.
3. "Yielding the floor" is defined as "physically surrendering" the microphone.
4. Failure to abide by any of the rules may result in suspension or revocation of the journalist's hard pass.

White House Correspondents' Association president Olivier Knox replied that they had "no role in crafting any procedures for future press conferences" and that reporters should continue to be allowed to ask follow-up questions.

=== Jim Acosta book ===
Jim Acosta wrote about the press conference incident with President Trump and its aftermath that led to the lawsuit in his 2019 book The Enemy of the People: A Dangerous Time to Tell the Truth in America.

=== September 2026 press ban ===
On September 18, 2026, Trump announced that he was banning CNN, MS NOW, and Politico from the White House, effective immediately. The following Monday, the three news outlets filed a lawsuit in the D.C. district court, seeking a temporary restraining order to lift the ban. The same day, the five members of the primary White House television pool, namely Fox, ABC, CBS, NBC, and CNN, issued a statement announcing that they were suspending coverage of the president.

== See also ==
- Donald Trump's conflict with the news media
- List of lawsuits involving Donald Trump
- Legal affairs of Donald Trump
- CNN controversies
