= National Commission on Geographical Names =

The National Commission on Geographical Names (Spanish: Comisión Nacional de Nombres Geográficos) is an interagency body within the Council of Ministers of Cuba that is responsible for the standardization of toponyms in the country. It was established on 15 May 1980 with a goal of standardizing more than 30,000 important toponyms across the country. The commission is headed by a representative of the Cuban Institute of Geodesy and Cartography. Members include representatives of the State Committee of Statistics, Ministry of Agriculture, Ministry of Education, Ministry of Higher Education, Ministry of Fisheries, Ministry of the Interior, Ministry of Foreign Affairs, Academy of Sciences, Cuban Institute of Hydrography, Institute of Physical Planning, National Institute of Hydraulic Resources, and the Attention Office for the Local Organs of the People's Power.
