= Donald Trump's conflict with the news media =

Donald Trump responds to Mary Bruce's question about releasing the Epstein files during his meeting with Saudi Crown Prince Mohammed bin Salman.

Donald Trump frequently attacks the American media as having a left-wing bias and being "corrupt", and also uses a variety of insults when speaking about outlets that give him unfavorable coverage. Trump has sued various media outlets for perceived inaccuracies or biases, and has used his position as president to pressure outlets he dislikes by interfering in their business operations, launching investigations, threatening to revoke broadcast licenses, and cutting funding for public broadcasting.

== Attacks on the media by Trump ==
You know why I do it? I do it to discredit you all and demean you all so that when you write negative stories about me no one will believe you.

— Trump's explanation of why he discredits and demeans the press in 2016, as recounted by Lesley Stahl during a talk at the Deadline Club of New York in 2018.

In 2020, the Committee to Protect Journalists published a special report by Leonard Downie Jr. titled "The Trump Administration and the Media". In the very beginning the report stated:

Trump has habitually attacked the news media in rallies, responses to reporters' questions, and many hundreds of tweets. He has repeatedly called the press "fake news," "the enemy of the people," "dishonest," "corrupt," "low life reporters," "bad people," "human scum" and "some of the worst human beings you'll ever meet."
...
More than 600 of Trump's tweets targeted specific news organizations, led by The New York Times, CNN, NBC and MSNBC, Fox News and The Washington Post. He called the Times, among other slurs, "fake," "phony," "nasty," "disgraced," "dumb," "clueless," "stupid," "sad," "failing," and "dying." He characterized the Post as "fake," "crazy," "dishonest," "phony," and "disgraced."

In March 2025, during his second term, Trump suggested media outlets CNN and MSNBC were doing illegal activities.

Trump says "Quiet, piggy".

On November 14, 2025, Trump answered a question from Catherine Lucey of Bloomberg News by saying "Quiet, piggy". On November 18, 2025, Trump told Mary Bruce of ABC News "You're a terrible person and a terrible reporter."

In March 2026, Trump posted "you can say that those Media Outlets that generated it should be brought up on Charges for TREASON".

Trump says "we're going to go to the media company that released it and we're going to say national security, give it up or go to jail."

In April 2026, about an alleged leak of the 2026 United States F-15E rescue operation in Iran, Trump said "we're going to go to the media company that released it and we're going to say national security, give it up or go to jail."

=== 2025 Pentagon press pass forfeiture ===
In September 2025, the Department of Defense set out new rules for reporters where they would not obtain or use unauthorized material even if the information is unclassified. On October 14, most media outlets including Fox News said it would not adhere to the new rules laid out for reporters.

"Today, we join virtually every other news organization in declining to agree to the Pentagon's new requirements, which would restrict journalists' ability to keep the nation and the world informed of important national security issues," the networks said in the statement. "The policy is without precedent and threatens core journalistic protections. We will continue to cover the U.S. military as each of our organizations has done for many decades, upholding the principles of a free and independent press."

=== "Enemy of the people" ===
Donald J. Trump
(@realDonaldTrump)
tweeted:

The FAKE NEWS media (failing @nytimes, @NBCNews, @ABC, @CBS, @CNN) is not my enemy, it is the enemy of the American People!

18 February 2017

Following his 2016 election campaign, Trump's attacks on the media as "fake news" led to increased searches of the topic.

CNN et al. v. Trump
- Court: United States District Court for the District of Columbia
- Started: September 21, 2026
- Defendant: Donald J. Trump
- Plaintiffs: Cable News Network, Inc. MS NOW; Politico

Court membership
- Judge sitting: Timothy J. Kelly

From his inauguration in January 2017 through October 15, 2019, Trump called the news media the "enemy of the people" 36 times on Twitter. In 2012, former Democratic pollster Patrick Caddell gave a speech at a conference sponsored by Accuracy in Media, a conservative watchdog group, in which he called the media "the enemy of the American people". The term was promoted by far-right media organization Breitbart News, one of whose major stockholders is Robert Mercer who employed Caddell as a contractor since 2013 and was one of Donald Trump's biggest financial backers. In February 2017, hours after meeting Caddell while touring a Boeing aircraft plant in North Charleston, South Carolina, Trump said on Twitter that The New York Times, NBC News, ABC, CBS, and CNN were "fake news" and "the enemy of the American People". On February 24, he said at the Conservative Political Action Conference, "A few days ago I called the fake news the enemy of the people and they are. They are the enemy of the people."

In a June 2018 rally in South Carolina, Trump called journalists "fake newsers" and "the enemy of the people". On July 19, following the critical reaction to his meeting with Russian president Vladimir Putin on 15 July 2018 in Helsinki, Finland, Trump tweeted "The Summit with Russia was a great success, except with the real enemy of the people, the Fake News Media." The New York Times noted Trump's use of this phrase during his "moments of peak criticism" and use of the term by Nazi and Soviet propaganda. On August 2, after Trump tweeted "FAKE NEWS media... is the enemy of the American People", multiple international institutions such as the United Nations and the Inter-American Commission on Human Rights criticized Trump for his attacks on the free press. On August 16, the United States Senate, in a symbolic rebuke to Trump, passed by unanimous consent a resolution affirming that the media is not "the enemy of the people" and reaffirming "the vital and indispensable role the free press serves."

In August 2019, when journalist Jonathan Karl asked him if he feared that his supporters would interpret this as a justification for violence, Trump replied: "I hope they take my words to heart. I believe the press is the enemy of the people." In March 2024, Trump, who had previously supported a congressional bill that would ban TikTok in the United States, said he now opposed a ban because it would help Facebook, and that he considered "Facebook to be an enemy of the people, along with a lot of the media".

== Removal of specific media personnel and outlets ==
In November 2018, Trump abruptly banned CNN reporter Jim Acosta from the White House after he asked a difficult question at a press conference and refused to relinquish the microphone before asking his second question; Trump berated him from the podium. CNN's lawsuit filed in response (on due process grounds) resulted in Acosta's access being restored before the end of the month. Thereafter, the White House published standards of conduct for press conferences. In early 2019, the Trump administration updated eligibility rules for White House press passes, yanking credentials from most of the White House press corps and refusing to give exemptions to Trump critics.

In August 2019, the Trump administration suspended, after allowing for an administrative appeal, the White House press pass of Playboy writer Brian Karem after a confrontation he had in the Rose Garden with right-wing commentator Sebastian Gorka. A panel of the DC Circuit Court of Appeals affirmed restoration of Karem's access on the grounds he was not afforded due process due to lack of published conduct standards for events outside of press conferences.

Shortly after the beginning of the President's second term, media outlets which published coverage Trump considered unfavorable were denied office space in the Pentagon, though still allowed to enter the building: CNN, The Washington Post, The Hill, The War Zone, NBC News, The New York Times, NPR, and Politico. These were replaced by outlets which had not requested Pentagon office space, almost all of which leaned conservative: Newsmax, the Washington Examiner, The Daily Caller, The Free Press, One America News Network, the New York Post, Breitbart News, and HuffPost (which leans progressive). The New York Times challenged the escort requirement in December 2025 and in July 2026, a federal judge ordered the Defense Department to halt this order temporarily on First Amendment grounds. In February 2025, President Trump indefinitely banned Associated Press reporters from pooled press events in the Oval Office and aboard Air Force One because they continued to use the term "Gulf of Mexico" instead of Trump's preferred term "Gulf of America". The decision is being challenged in Associated Press v. Budowich.

=== CNN, MS NOW, Politico ===
On September 18, 2026, Trump announced on Truth Social that he would ban CNN, MS NOW, and Politico reporters from the White House effective immediately, arguing that all three outlets were responsible for continuously reporting "fake news". The move was unusual in its directness, as it targeted specific news organizations by name rather than through broader access restrictions; he claimed that Politico received an "illegal and ridiculous" $8 million subscription from the U.S. government during Joe Biden's presidency, and that MS NOW had rebranded from "MSNBC" due to declining viewership and credibility (the rebranding was due to the network's separation from NBCUniversal and NBC News into a new company). Trump warned that other outlets would also be targeted, stating that they should not be able to constantly "write or report fiction and lies" when covering the president.

Politico stated that the claims made by Trump were "false and have been thoroughly debunked", and an MS NOW spokesperson stated that the network "intends to take any and all steps necessary to defend our First Amendment rights and the essential role of independent journalism in our democracy."

On September 21, White House television pool chair Bryan Boughton announced that the pool would suspend its television coverage of "events designated as pool coverage of the President", in protest of the removal of CNN. In solidarity, outlets including the Associated Press, New York Times, and Washington Post announced that they would postpone until midnight the publication of their White House press photographs of the day. Following the withdrawal of the press pool, the Trump administration launched the YouTube channel "Trump TV", which primarily broadcasts a playlist of previous Trump campaign events and speeches, as well as live coverage of presidential events.

On September 26, Trump told a female reporter from MS NOW who questioned him about the press pool that she was "fake news" and "MS DNC", and then told her to "be quiet".

In an interview on the ABC News program This Week on September 27, attorney general Todd Blanche said that access to the White House by news outlets is "a privilege and not a right", and that Trump is "sick and tired" of what he considers inaccurate reporting. When asked for an example of such reporting, Blanche said that "information coming out of CNN and some of these other networks" is "almost 100 percent negative toward the president".

On September 28, 2026, CNN, MS NOW, and Politico jointly filed a 42-page motion in federal court seeking a preliminary injunction against the White House media ban, requesting that the restrictions be suspended until the case is resolved. In the filing, lawyers for the three outlets argued that the administration had continued to implement the ban in an unpredictable and inconsistent manner despite an existing restraining order, citing in particular the selective exclusion of CNN from White House pool duties. The filing cautioned that, if given the opportunity, the White House would "immediately reinstitute a complete ban of CNN, MS NOW, and Politico." It further stated that the ban constituted "an unlawful assault on the most fundamental First Amendment freedoms" and would cause "irreparable harm on Plaintiffs and the public if not restrained," and asked the court to keep the ban on hold until the case is resolved.

==== CNN et al. v. Trump ====
On September 21, the three banned outlets jointly filed a lawsuit, alleging infringement of the First Amendment and due process. In a statement, they wrote, "We are filing a lawsuit today to protect our First Amendment rights and defend the principle that the government does not decide what the press reports or publishes."

On September 22, the Department of Justice filed a response to the suit with the court, including letters sent by the White House to each of the outlets accusing them of "trafficking in verifiable falsehoods about national security and other issues, and publishing sensitive or classified information." Michael Velchik, senior counsel at the DOJ's civil division, wrote in the filing that "Access to the White House is a privilege — not a right."

On September 23, Judge Timothy J. Kelly heard arguments. Just after midnight, he granted a 14-day temporary restraining order requiring the White House to restore the journalists' press credentials while the case proceeded. After initially being denied access on the morning of September 24, reporters from all three outlets entered the building around noon. Kelly said he would issue a final ruling soon.

On September 24, the press pool did not cover a state visit by Chinese leader Xi Jinping, and reporters from CNN and MS Now were barred from covering a state dinner in his honor. Pool coverage resumed the following morning. The White House then said CNN could not fly on Air Force One to cover Trump's September 26 trip to Tennessee for college football, and chose the pro-Trump outlet Real America's Voice to accompany him instead. On September 30, the White House once again removed CNN from pool coverage for the following day, leaving Real America's Voice to cover Trump's travels on October 1.

On October 8, Theodore J Boutrous, attorney for the banned outlets, asked judge Kelly for an extension of the temporary restraining order that was set to expire that day. Boutrous also pointed to a recent interview of Trump in Time magazine as evidence that the press ban was due to critical coverage of the president, not national security concerns. White House lawyer Michael Velchik countered that the outlets' journalists did not adhere to basic standards of conduct. Kelly agreed to extend the restraining order until October 13, and said he would likely rule on a preliminary injunction motion by then.

On October 13, judge Kelly granted a preliminary injunction, allowing CNN, MS NOW, and Politico journalists to keep their White House access. In his decision, Kelly said the president’s move to block those outlets likely amounted to a legal violation. Kelly said he based his ruling on Trump’s public statements, which showed that the ban was tied to the outlets' alleged "bias and inaccuracies," not to any national security threat. Government attorneys later raised security concerns in court, but Kelly did not accept that rationale. He called the measure a form of "viewpoint discrimination," and said that made it unlawful. The injunction will remain in place while the case proceeds, unless a higher court decides otherwise.

== Retaliatory lawsuits ==
Trump sued ABC News over a This Week interview, in which George Stephanopoulos said Trump had been found liable for "rape", though the technical jury determination in E. Jean Carroll v. Donald J. Trump was for "sexual abuse". Though many lawyers thought ABC would win the suit due to the high legal bar for defamation of public figures, after Trump was elected president a second time, ABC settled and paid $15 million to the Trump presidential library, $1 million in legal fees, and gave an apology. Trump also sued the pollster for The Des Moines Register for predicting that Trump would lose Iowa in November 2024.

In 2020, Trump sued The Washington Post and The New York Times for defamation over opinion pieces that alleged connections between the campaign and Russia. In 2021, the lawsuit against The Times was dismissed. In 2023, the lawsuit against The Post was dismissed.

In 2021, Trump sued Mary L. Trump and The New York Times over stories on leaked tax records. The lawsuit was dismissed in 2023. In 2023, Trump filed a lawsuit against Bob Woodward and Simon & Schuster for $50 million, asserting copyright over inclusion of taped interviews with Trump in an audio book, The Trump Tapes. The lawsuit was dismissed in 2025.

In October 2024, Trump sued CBS News for releasing two different clips of an interview with Kamala Harris, Trump's opponent in the presidential election, on the television program 60 Minutes, alleging deceitful manipulation to harm his electoral chances. In July 2025, CBS's parent company Paramount, which needs the Trump administration's approval for a planned merger with Skydance, agreed to pay $16 million to Trump's future presidential library and to release transcripts of future interviews with presidential candidates on 60 Minutes.

Trump sued Meta after it suspended his accounts following the January 6 U.S. Capitol attack by a mob of Trump supporters. Section 230 of Title 47 of the United States Code generally exempts internet companies from liability for the material that users post, giving Internet companies broad license in moderating their services by removing posts that, for instance, are obscene or are blatantly false or inciting violence or otherwise violate the services' own standards, so long as they are acting in "good faith". Meta had suspended several accounts used by Trump and associates over repeated violations. In January 2025 Meta agreed to pay $25 million to settle that suit. The Associated Press reported, "It's the latest instance of a large corporation settling litigation with the president, who has threatened retribution on his critics and rivals, and comes as Meta and its CEO, Mark Zuckerberg, have joined other large technology companies in trying to ingratiate themselves with the new Trump administration." In February 2025, Twitter reportedly settled for around $10 million for suspending Trump's account. In September 2025, YouTube agreed to pay $24.5 million to settle a lawsuit for suspending accounts following January 6 with $22 million going toward the White House Ballroom.

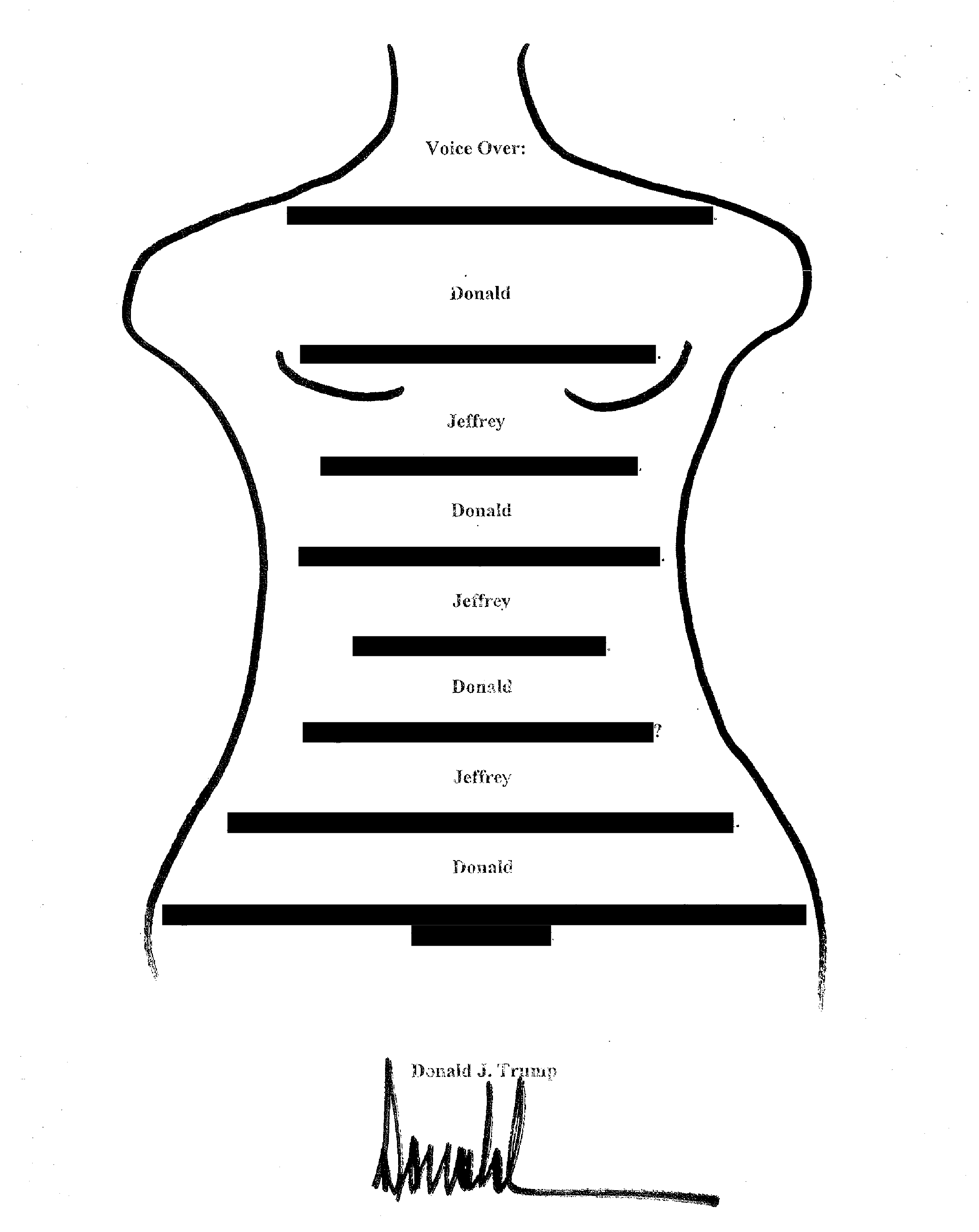
2003 birthday letter to Jeffrey Epstein (text is censored due to potential copyright concerns)

Also in July 2025, Trump sued The Wall Street Journal and its owners for $10 billion over a story that described a collection of letters from associates of Jeffrey Epstein for his birthday book. The story focused on one letter which contained "the outline of a naked woman, which appears to be hand-drawn with a heavy marker" concluding "Happy Birthday — and may every day be another wonderful secret" with Trump's signature below her waist. The Journal sought to dismiss the lawsuit. In April 2026, the case was dismissed without prejudice, with Judge Darrin P. Gayles of the U.S. District Court of the Southern District of Florida, who said Trump and his legal team had not "plausibly alleged" that the Journal wrote the piece with actual malice. The case was refiled in May, and dismissed with prejudice by Gayles in October; Gayles described Trump as trying to manufacture flaws in the Journal's reporting.

In September 2025, Trump sued The New York Times, four of its reporters, and Penguin Random House, the publisher of a book written by two of the reporters, in the U.S. District Court for the Middle District of Florida seeking $15 billion in damages for defamation. The complaint cited three articles written by Peter Baker and Michael S. Schmidt and a book co-written by Russ Buettner and Susanne Craig that were published within two months of the 2024 presidential election. Less than a week after the lawsuit was filed, Judge Steven D. Merryday dismissed the 85-page complaint as "improper and impermissible" under Rule 8 of the Federal Rules of Civil Procedure for not stating the first allegation until page 80 and being full of material irrelevant to the allegations made, saying that a complaint is neither a "public forum for vituperation and invective" nor a "megaphone for public relations or a podium for a passionate oration at a political rally or the functional equivalent of the Hyde Park Speakers' Corner". Merryday allowed Trump to file a shorter complaint, which Trump did, and then Merryday said the lawsuit could proceed.

In 2025, a lawsuit by Trump against CNN alleging defamation for using the phrase big lie seeking $475 million was dismissed. In December 2025, Trump filed a defamation lawsuit against the BBC for airing a Panorama documentary produced before the 2024 presidential election with footage of Trump's speech before the January 6 United States Capitol attack that Trump alleges was deceptively edited.

== Federal government actions ==
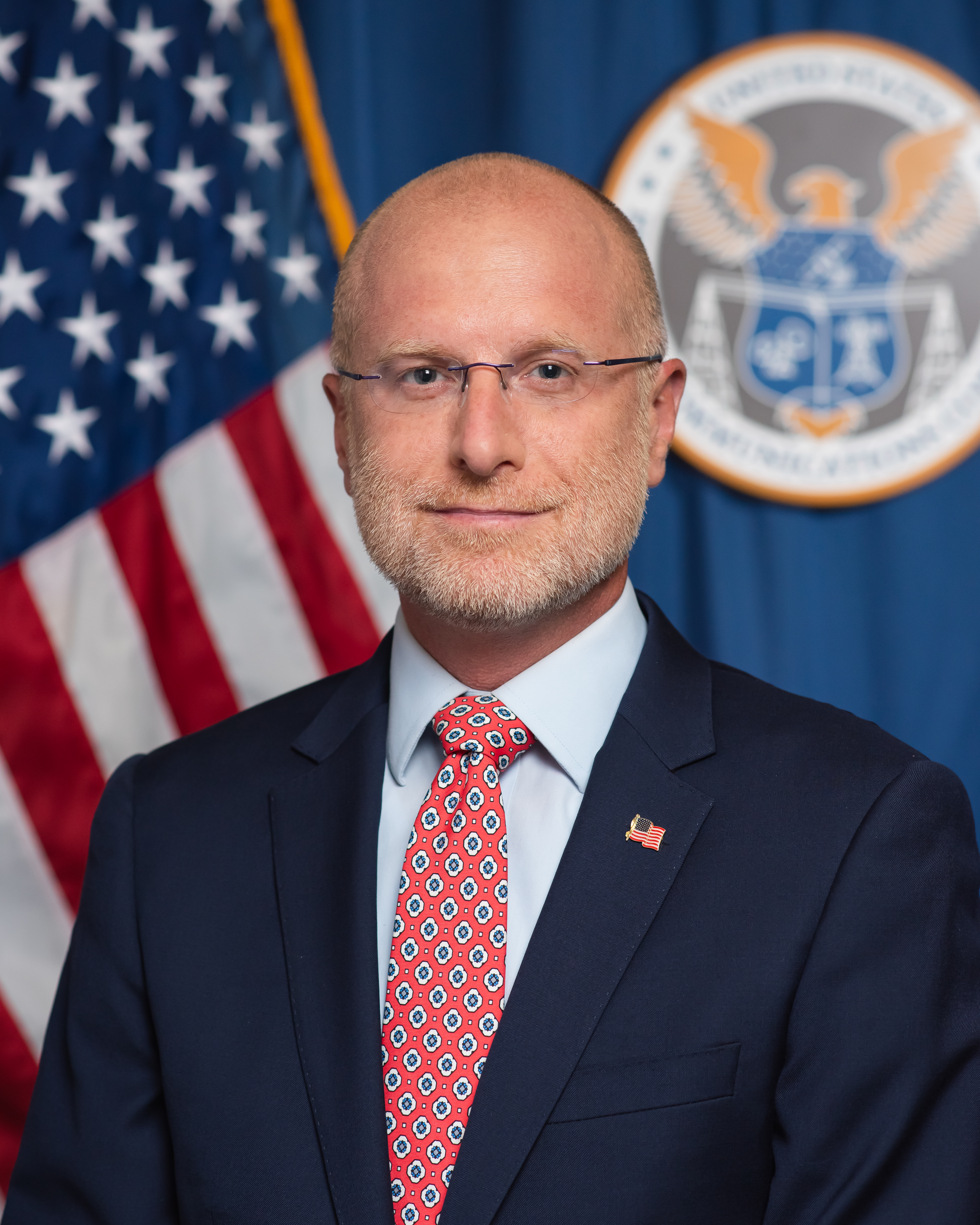
FCC chair Brendan Carr

During Trump's first term in office, in 2017 the Department of Justice blocked AT&T's purchase of Time Warner unless it sold off CNN, a cable network that Trump often attacks.

Shortly after Trump took office for a second time in January 2025, new Federal Communications Commission (FCC) chair Brendan Carr opened an investigation into underwriting credits on NPR and PBS. In contrast, Trump nominated 19 current and former hosts, reporters, and commentators to work in his second administration from the conservative-leaning Fox. In February 2025, FCC chair Carr demanded full footage from a 60 Minutes interview with Trump opponent Kamala Harris, which Trump was also suing Paramount (the parent company of CBS) over, alleging biased editing. Approval of Carr and the FCC were required for the then-pending acquisition of Paramount by Skydance Media. Carr also revived previously dismissed complaints against ABC and NBC, but not Fox News, which tends to give Trump favorable coverage. On May 5, 2025, in an interview with CNBC's Sara Eisen, FCC chair Carr said he would consider pulling CBS's broadcast license.

In May 2025, Trump issued Executive Order 14290 instructing the Corporation for Public Broadcasting (CPB) Board of Directors and all executive departments and agencies to cease federal funding for NPR and PBS. In July 2025, Trump signed the Rescissions Act of 2025. After failing to advance budget measures to eliminate federal funding for public broadcasting during his first administration, Trump requested a rescission bill to eliminate federal funding for the CPB, which passed in both chambers of the Republican-controlled Congress largely along party lines in July 2025, despite warnings from public media advocates that it would result in the closure of some stations and hamper access to emergency alerts in rural communities; the CPB's defunding and resulting closure would result in some public television and radio stations imposing staffing and programming cuts (with some electing to drop PBS and/or NPR programming altogether).

Trump habitually complains about talk and late-night comedy shows that criticize him. On September 17, 2025, following pressure from the administration Jimmy Kimmel Live! was suspended. The show was reinstated on September 23. In January 2026, the FCC changed its rules to remove the talk show exemption from the equal-time rule. The FCC then started enforcing the expanded rule against the US Senate campaign of James Talarico, a Texas Democrat. The agency opened an investigation into his appearance on The View. Fearing federal legal action, lawyers at CBS prevented the broadcast of Talarico's appearance on The Late Show with Stephen Colbert, which published the segment only on YouTube. The suppression was criticized as censorship. Carr said this rule would not be enforced against radio talk shows, which Jake Tapper pointed out in the US is largely conservative talk radio.

A 2025 memorandum from Attorney General Pam Bondi rescinds a policy preventing the United States Department of Justice "from seeking records and compelling testimony from members of the news media in order to identify and punish the source of improper leaks".

In 2025, all but one publication forfeited their access to the Pentagon building after implementation of a new policy that requires credentialed publications to only publish information approved by the Department of Defense, regardless of where or how it was gathered. The New York Times sued in response, on the grounds this violates the First Amendment guarantee of freedom of the press, and the Fifth Amendment guarantee of due process.

In July 2026, following reporting on Trump's Qatari jet, the administration subpoenaed "phone service providers" for the phone and text messaging records of multiple New York Times journalists and their relatives in addition to federal grand jury subpoenas which were delivered to the journalists, seeking their sources. Relatives included: "one reporter’s mother was a mental health professional, and another reporter’s spouse was employed in a senior role at a major law firm." After a hearing before Judge Arun Subramanian, the administration withdrew the subpoenas.

=== Influences by online media ecosystem ===
During the second administration, there has been an increasing collaboration between the administration and right leaning media as compared to previous administrations and protocols, with mainstream media more or less disregarded. With this evident by the information provided concerning the United States–Iran war.

== See also ==
- Social media use by Donald Trump
- First presidency of Donald Trump § Relationship with the news media
- Timeline of government attacks on journalists in the United States § 2016–present: Trump era
- Press freedom in the United States
- Democratic backsliding in the United States
- Targeting of political opponents and civil society under the second Trump administration
