= Sherrill v. Knight =

1977 United States Court of Appeals case concerning White House press credentials

- Court: United States Court of Appeals for the District of Columbia Circuit
- Decided: December 15, 1977

Case history
- Prior actions: Forcade v. Knight, 416 F. Supp. 1025 (D.D.C. 1976)

Holding
- The First and Fifth Amendments require that denial of a White House press pass be based on an adequately defined governmental interest and that an applicant receive notice of the factual basis for denial, an opportunity to rebut it, and a final written statement of the reasons for denial.

Court membership
- Judges sitting: Carl E. McGowan, Harold Leventhal, Spottswood W. Robb

Sherrill v. Knight, 569 F.2d 124 (D.C. Cir. 1977), was a decision of the United States Court of Appeals for the District of Columbia Circuit concerning the denial of White House press credentials. The court held that, once the White House had established press facilities for bona fide journalists, the First Amendment limited the government's ability to deny access arbitrarily or for less than compelling reasons. The court further held that the Fifth Amendment required procedural protections for journalists whose applications were denied, including notice of the factual basis for the denial, an opportunity to rebut the allegations, and a final written statement explaining the reasons for the decision.

== Background ==
Robert Sherrill was a Washington correspondent for The Nation and had held credentials for the press galleries of the House and Senate. In 1966, he applied for a White House press pass but was denied after the United States Secret Service conducted a security investigation and recommended that he not receive a credential.

At the time, there were no published standards explaining the criteria used by the Secret Service in determining whether a journalist should receive a White House press pass. Applicants who were denied were generally told only that the denial was based on reasons relating to the security of the President or members of the President's immediate family.

Sherrill sought information about the basis for the denial. In 1972, the Secret Service confirmed that he had been denied accreditation for security reasons. A subsequent response to a Freedom of Information Act request identified an assault conviction as one reason considered by officials. Sherrill was not, however, given an administrative procedure through which he could formally contest the basis of the denial.

Sherrill subsequently brought suit in the United States District Court for the District of Columbia, alleging that the denial violated the First and Fifth Amendments.

== District court proceedings ==
The district court concluded that the government was required to establish and publish standards governing the denial of White House press passes. It also required procedures under which a journalist would receive notice of the evidence supporting a proposed denial, an opportunity to rebut or explain that evidence, and a final written decision stating the reasons for the denial.

The government appealed to the D.C. Circuit.

== Decision ==
The D.C. Circuit decided the case on December 15, 1977. The opinion was written by Judge Carl E. McGowan, with Judges Harold Leventhal and Spottswood W. Robb on the panel.

=== First Amendment ===
The court distinguished between a general right of public access to the White House and access to press facilities that the government had voluntarily established for journalists. It held that the First Amendment did not require the White House to open its doors to the press, conduct press conferences, or maintain press facilities. However, once press facilities had been established and made available to bona fide journalists, the government's administration of access to those facilities implicated First Amendment interests in newsgathering.

The court concluded that access could not be denied arbitrarily or for less than compelling reasons. It recognized protection of the President as a compelling governmental interest and held that the Secret Service could deny a press pass when an applicant presented a sufficiently serious potential threat to the physical security of the President or the President's immediate family.

The court rejected the district court's requirement that the government formulate highly detailed and narrowly specific criteria for every decision. Instead, it held that the Secret Service could be guided by the general principle of whether an applicant presented a sufficiently serious potential danger to the President or the President's immediate family. The standard nevertheless had to be made publicly known so that applicants and reviewing courts could understand the basis on which credentials could be denied.

=== Due process ===
The court also held that the First Amendment interest implicated by access to White House press facilities constituted a protected liberty interest under the Fifth Amendment's Due Process Clause.

It therefore held that applicants denied press credentials were entitled to certain procedural protections. These included: notice of the factual basis for the proposed denial, an opportunity for the applicant to rebut or explain the information relied upon by the government, and a final written statement setting out the reasons for the denial.

The court explained that these procedures were necessary to help ensure that a denial was actually based on the government's legitimate interest in presidential security rather than on arbitrary or otherwise impermissible considerations.

== Judgment ==
The D.C. Circuit affirmed the district court's judgment insofar as it required procedural safeguards. It modified the portion of the judgment requiring the government to formulate "narrow and specific" standards, holding instead that the Secret Service was required to make publicly known an explicit and meaningful standard focused on threats to the physical security of the President and the President's immediate family.

The court did not order that Sherrill himself be issued a White House press pass. Instead, it required the government to reconsider applications under constitutionally adequate standards and procedures.

== Significance ==
Sherrill v. Knight became an important precedent concerning the constitutional limits on government-controlled press access. The decision established that a government-operated press-credentialing system could not be administered through wholly undisclosed criteria and procedures when the system implicated journalists' First Amendment interests.

The decision has subsequently been cited in litigation involving White House press credentials and disputes over journalists' access to the executive branch. For example, later litigation concerning the suspension of White House press credentials has relied on Sherrill in addressing the requirements of notice, meaningful standards, and procedural due process.

The decision does not establish an unrestricted constitutional right for every journalist to enter the White House. Rather, it addresses the constitutional requirements governing a system through which the government provides press access to journalists.

== See also ==
- Freedom of the press in the United States
- First Amendment to the United States Constitution
- Due process
- White House press corps
- United States Court of Appeals for the District of Columbia Circuit
- CNN v. Trump
