= Commission on Standardization of Geographical Names Outside the Republic of Poland =

- Komisja Standaryzacji Nazw Geograficznych poza Granicami Rzeczypospolitej Polskiej

Agency overview
- Jurisdiction: Government of Poland
- Website: www.gov.pl/web/ksng-en

The Commission on Standardization of Geographical Names Outside the Republic of Poland (Polish: Komisja Standaryzacji Nazw Geograficznych poza Granicami Rzeczypospolitej Polskiej) is a Polish government advisory and scientific body.

The Commission prepares the "Official List of Polish Geographical Names of the World" containing the Polish-language names of geographic features located outside Poland.
