= Jim Acosta =

American broadcast journalist (born 1971)

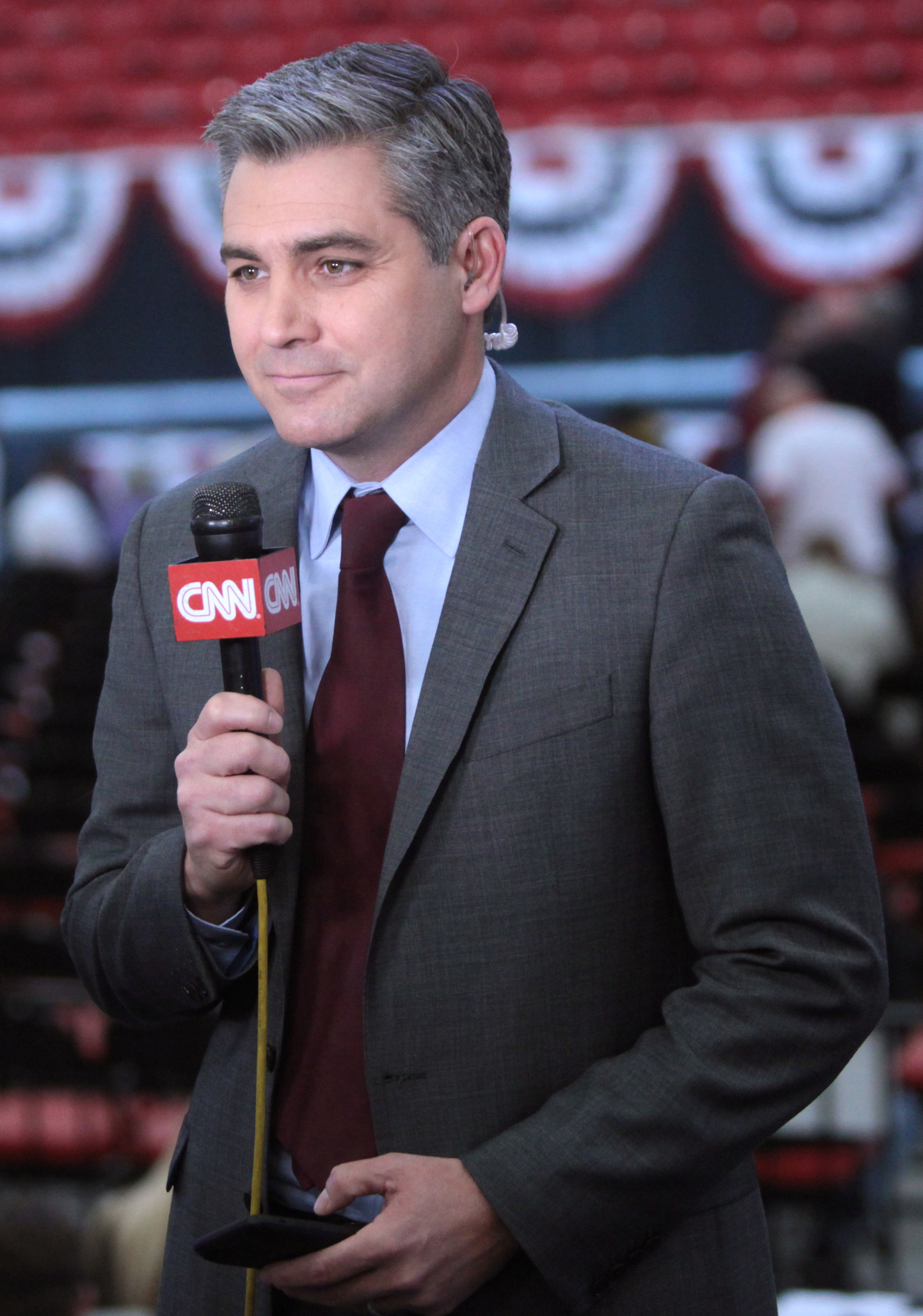
- Acosta in February 2016
- Born: Abilio James Acosta; April 17, 1971 (age 55); Washington, D.C., U.S.
- Education: James Madison University (BA)
- Occupation: Journalist
- Known for: CNN journalist and anchor (2007–2025)
- Spouses: Sharon Mobley Stow (m. 1999; div. 2017); Liz Landers (m. 2026)
- Children: 2

Abilio James Acosta (born April 17, 1971) is an American broadcast journalist. From 2007 to 2025, he worked for CNN. He served as CNN's chief White House correspondent during the Obama and first Trump administrations, in which he gained national attention for his clashes with President Donald Trump at press briefings. In January 2021, Acosta was appointed CNN's anchor and chief domestic correspondent. On January 28, 2025, Acosta made his final broadcast on CNN after rejecting a different time slot for his CNN Newsroom show.

== Early life and education ==
Acosta's father arrived in the United States at age 11 as a refugee from Santa María del Rosario, Cuba, three weeks before the Cuban Missile Crisis. His ancestors were originally from the Canary Islands. Acosta's mother is of Irish and Czech ancestry. Acosta was raised in Virginia, and graduated from Annandale High School in 1989. In 1993, he earned a bachelor's degree in mass communication, with a minor in political science, from James Madison University. While in school, Acosta volunteered for WXJM, the student-run radio station. He also worked as a reporter at WSVA, a local radio station owned and operated by Saga Communications. He got married in 1999 to Sharon Mobley Stow, a registered nurse, and the couple had two children. They divorced in 2017.

== Media career ==
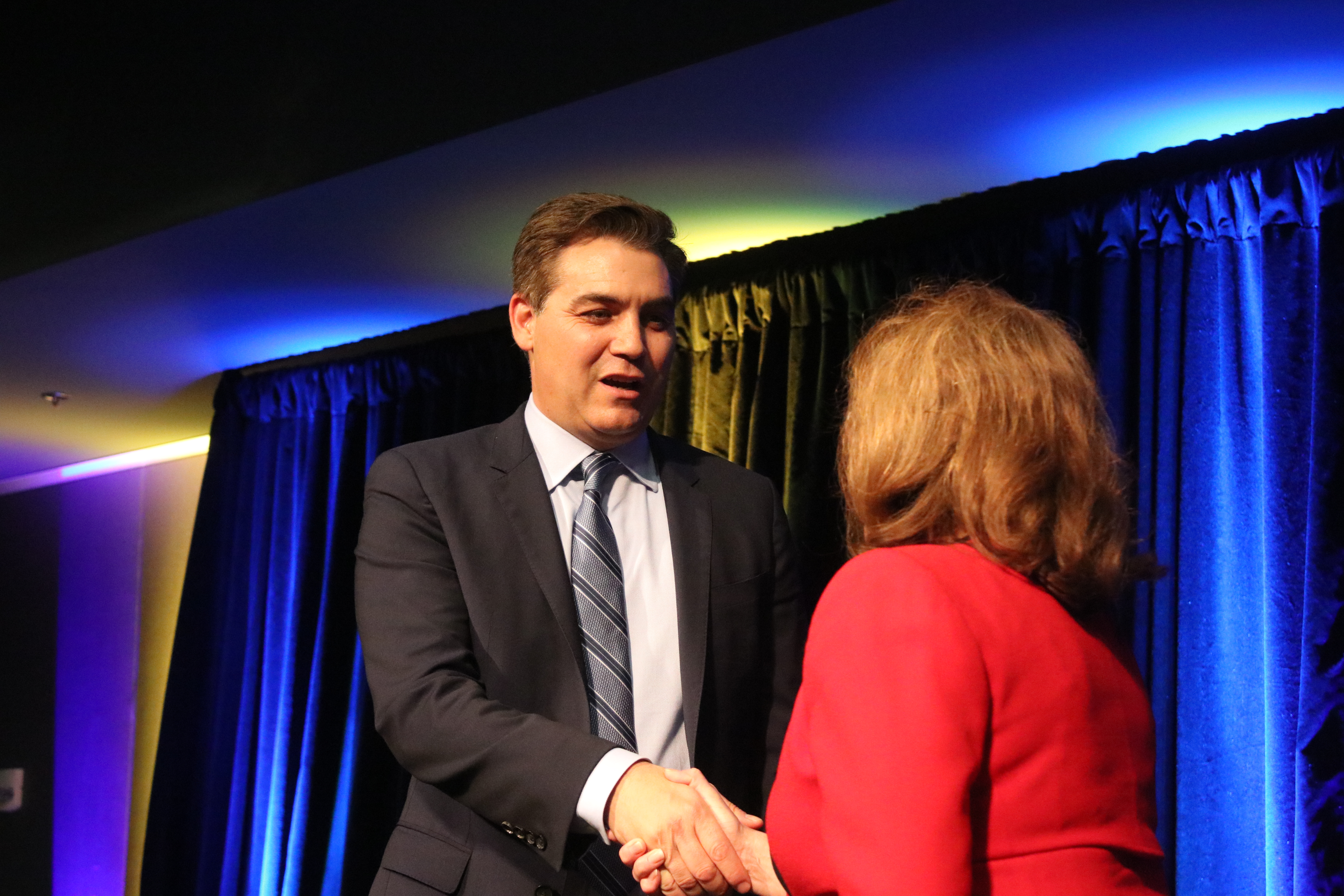
As CNN Chief White House Correspondent, Acosta meets an audience member after the 2018 William Randolph Hearst Award presentation.

Acosta began his professional career in radio, and his first job was with WMAL in Washington, DC. In 1994, Acosta left WMAL and entered television, working for Fox affiliate WTTG-TV as a desk assistant. In 1995, Acosta moved in front of the camera, becoming a reporter and substitute anchor at NBC affiliate WBIR-TV in Knoxville, Tennessee, and remained in that job until 1998. From 1998 until 2000, Acosta worked as a reporter for CBS affiliate KTVT-TV in Fort Worth. From 2000 until 2001, Acosta was a reporter for WBBM-TV in Chicago. From 2001 until 2003, Acosta worked as a correspondent for CBS News' Newspath service, based both in Dallas and Chicago. From February 2003 until March 2007, Acosta was a correspondent for CBS News and was based first in New York City and then in Atlanta. At CBS News, Acosta covered the 2004 campaign of Democratic presidential candidate John Kerry, the Iraq War from Baghdad, and Hurricane Katrina. In April 2007, Acosta joined CNN.

During the following year, Acosta covered the 2008 presidential campaigns of Democratic candidates Barack Obama and Hillary Clinton, frequently appearing as an anchor of CNN's weekend political program, Ballot Bowl. Acosta later joined CNN's American Morning program as a correspondent and contributed to the network's coverage of the 2010 midterm elections. In February 2012, CNN promoted Acosta to the position of national political correspondent. In his role as national political correspondent, Acosta was the network's lead correspondent in covering the 2012 presidential campaign of Republican nominee Mitt Romney. He was then the senior White House correspondent for CNN. At a nationally televised news conference in November 2015, Acosta challenged President Obama on his administration's strategy for destroying the terrorist organization known as ISIS. Acosta asked, "Why can't we take out these bastards?"

Acosta traveled to Cuba in March 2016 to cover President Obama's historic trip to the island. At a rare news conference in Havana featuring both Obama and Cuban president Raúl Castro, Acosta pressed the Cuban leader on his country's human-rights record. Acosta was promoted to chief White House correspondent on January 9, 2018. In January 2021, CNN announced that Acosta would be the network's chief domestic correspondent and weekend anchor. The moves aligned with the incoming Biden administration.

=== President Trump press conferences ===
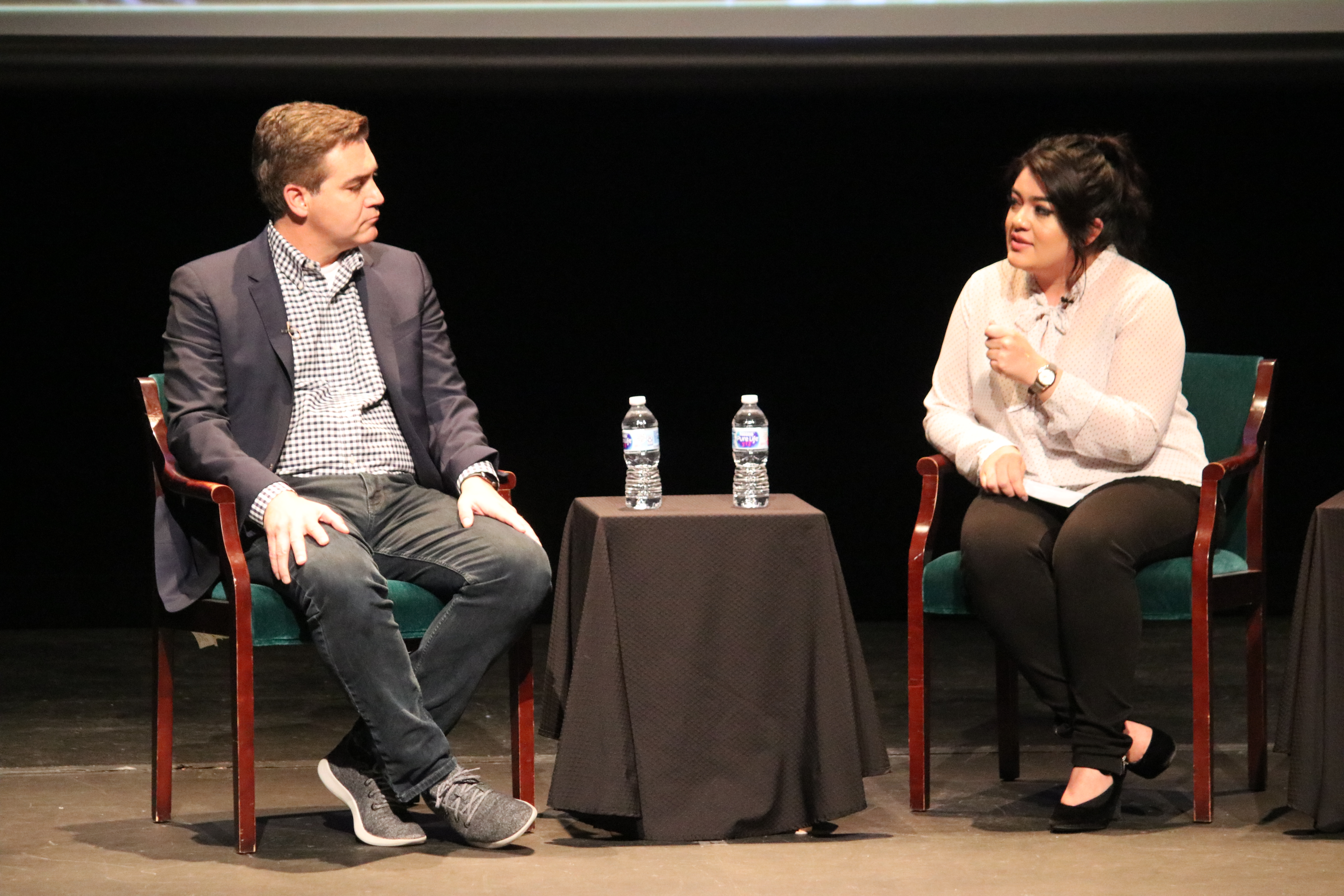
Acosta at San Jose State University, October 2018

At a nationally televised news conference in May 2016, Republican presidential candidate Donald Trump called Acosta "a real beauty" for his reporting. Interrupting Acosta, who asked Trump about his ability to deal with scrutiny, Trump said: "Excuse me, excuse me, I've watched you on TV. You're a real beauty." During President-elect Trump's first press conference on January 11, 2017, Acosta attempted to ask a question regarding Russia, but Trump called on others, describing Acosta and CNN as "fake news".

Acosta got into a heated debate at a White House press conference on August 2, 2017, with White House senior policy advisor Stephen Miller over the Trump administration's support for the RAISE Act. Politico said this interchange "cemented Acosta's undisputed role as the chief antagonist" for CNN against the Trump administration. On August 2, 2018, Acosta asked the press secretary of the White House Sarah Huckabee Sanders if she agreed to disavow President Trump's description of journalists as "the enemy of the people", but she did not directly answer the question, instead speaking about her own treatment by the media.

==== November 2018 White House ban ====
November 7, 2018, complete press conference video from the White House

External videos
- November 7, 2018 exchange between Trump and Acosta, from TIME magazine

Acosta verbally sparred with President Trump during a White House press conference on November 7, 2018, following the 2018 midterm elections. During the press conference, President Trump briefly responded to Jim Acosta's question about immigration rhetoric and campaign ads, and then moved on to another journalist. However, Acosta attempted to ask follow-up questions and speak over Trump and other reporters. Trump repeatedly told Acosta, "that's enough", and told him to "put down the mic". Later Trump described him as "a rude, terrible person".

According to the Press Secretary Sanders, Acosta interfered with a White House intern who was in charge of the roving microphone, pushing her arm aside. Subsequently, Acosta's press pass, U.S. Secret Service security credentials facilitating entry onto the White House grounds, was suspended "until further notice." CNN described Acosta's suspension as "retaliation for his challenging questions" and accused Sanders of lying.

The following day, the White House circulated a video, which CNN said was doctored. The White House video matched a video posted by conspiracy theorist Paul Joseph Watson of the far-right website InfoWars, which had been edited to portray the contact as approaching a physical blow. Social media intelligence agency Storyful said that, within the two-second long snippet of video that is repeated within the 15-seconds long overall clip, three frames are paused a fraction of a second, resulting in a slight time compression elsewhere than this highlighted footage showing brief contact of the intern's arm with Acosta's. Watson said he did not alter the clip, obtained from a GIF posted at The Daily Wire and that he republished as a compressed MP4 file after adding a zoomed-in replay.

CNN made behind-the-scenes efforts to restore Acosta's access and prepared a lawsuit. Media law professor Jonathan Peters said that "a journalist has a first-amendment right of access to places closed to the public, but open generally to the press [... which] can't be denied arbitrarily or absent compelling reasons" and free speech litigator Floyd Abrams said, "CNN might have reluctance to have a lawsuit titled 'CNN vs. Donald Trump.' That said, yes, I think they should sue."

Trump said Acosta's action as depicted "wasn't overly horrible". Concerning the clip, Trump said, "They gave a close-up view. That's not doctoring." Counselor to the President Kellyanne Conway described the clip as not altered but sped up, taking exception to what she believed the "overwrought description of this video as being doctored as if we put somebody else's arm in there."

=== Litigation ===
On November 13, 2018, CNN and Acosta, through counsel Ted Boutrous and Ted Olson of Gibson Dunn, filed civil suit in the U.S. District Court for the District of Columbia against Trump, White House Chief of Staff John Kelly, Deputy Chief of Staff/Director of Communications Bill Shine, Press Secretary Sarah Huckabee Sanders, the U.S. Secret Service and its director, Randolph Alles, and an unnamed Secret Service agent, all in their official capacities. The filing also requested relief by way of an order temporarily restraining the White House from denying access to Acosta for journalistic purposes.

Amicus briefs were filed with the court in support of CNN's case, from journalistic entities whose editorial policies range across the political spectrum. The U.S. Department of Justice filed a brief arguing that First Amendment free speech rights do not "restrict the president's ability to determine the terms on which he does, or does not, engage with particular journalists." The case was heard by Timothy Kelly, a Trump appointee to the District Court for the District of Columbia, who, on November 16, ordered Acosta's credentials restored for 14 days, owing to the court's belief that Acosta's due-process rights likely had been violated, with the court's making no reference of the suit's arguments thus far concerning the First Amendment.

CNN eventually dropped the lawsuit on November 19 after the White House restored Acosta's press credentials with conditions, including that reporters called upon would be limited to one question with no follow-up questions unless granted permission. Acosta wrote about the incident in his 2019 book The Enemy of the People: A Dangerous Time to Tell the Truth in America.

=== Departure from CNN ===
On January 23, 2025, three days after Inauguration Day, CNN announced upcoming changes to its weekday lineup, including the replacement of Acosta and Pamela Brown's hours of CNN Newsroom with a rescheduling of The Situation Room into its morning timeslots, co-anchored by Brown and Wolf Blitzer. The fate of Acosta's role at CNN was left unclear by the new schedule, with reports indicating that he had declined an offer to move to a late-night program that would have likely been based in Los Angeles (which some CNN employees believed was a ploy to move him into a lesser-viewed timeslot due to his history of being critical towards Trump). On January 28, Acosta announced that he would depart CNN to pursue new opportunities, directing social media followers to a new Substack blog.

== Published works ==
- Acosta, Jim (2019). The Enemy of the People: A Dangerous Time to Tell the Truth in America. New York: Harper. ISBN 9780062916129. OCLC 1102648075.
