= Branding of United States government programs and facilities after Donald Trump =

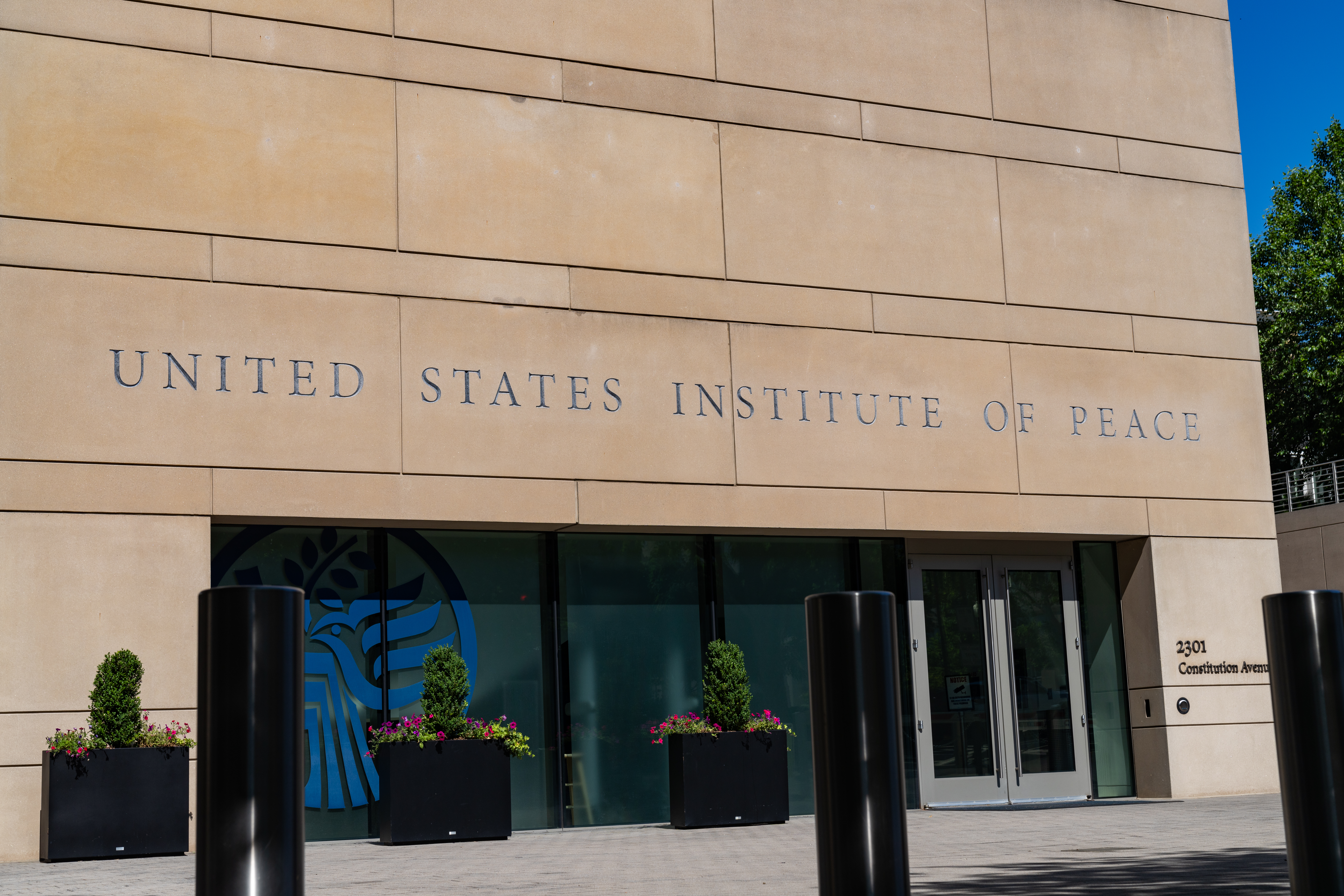
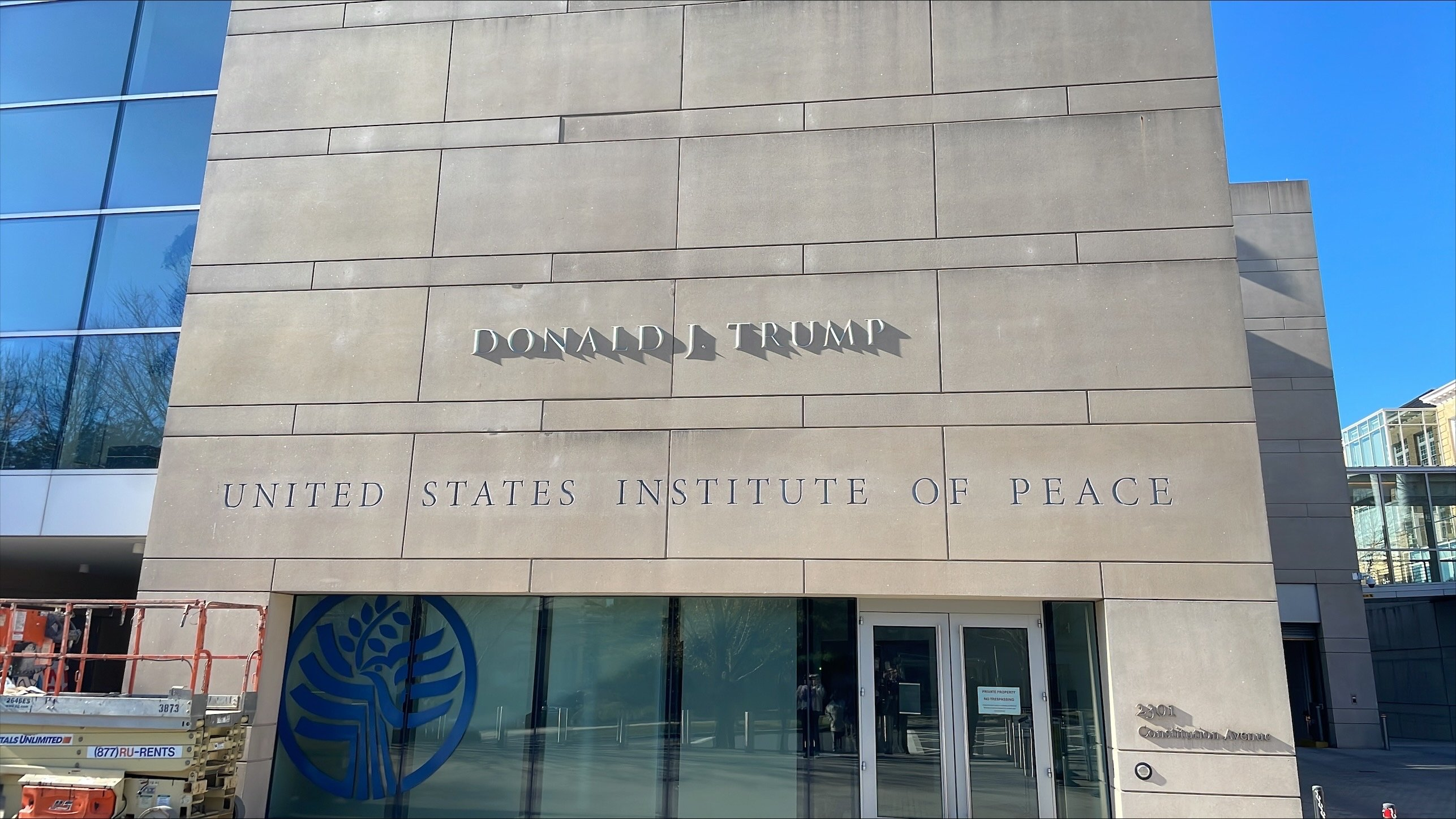
The facade of the Institute of Peace before (top) and after (bottom) the 2025 addition of Donald Trump's name

During the second presidency of Donald Trump, a number of United States government facilities and programs were officially named after Donald Trump or had his likeness put on them. While it is common in the United States to use former presidents' names for memorials to honor past service, it is unusual to do so for a sitting president. This activity has been described as engendering a cult of personality in Trump. Some, such as the renaming of the John F. Kennedy Center for the Performing Arts, have been legally contested and overturned.

== Renamings ==
=== Institute of Peace ===
On December 3, 2025, the exterior of the United States Institute of Peace was adorned with additional lettering renaming the facility to the Donald J. Trump United States Institute of Peace, in preparation for a signing ceremony of the 2025 DRC–Rwanda peace agreement on the following day.

=== Kennedy Center ===
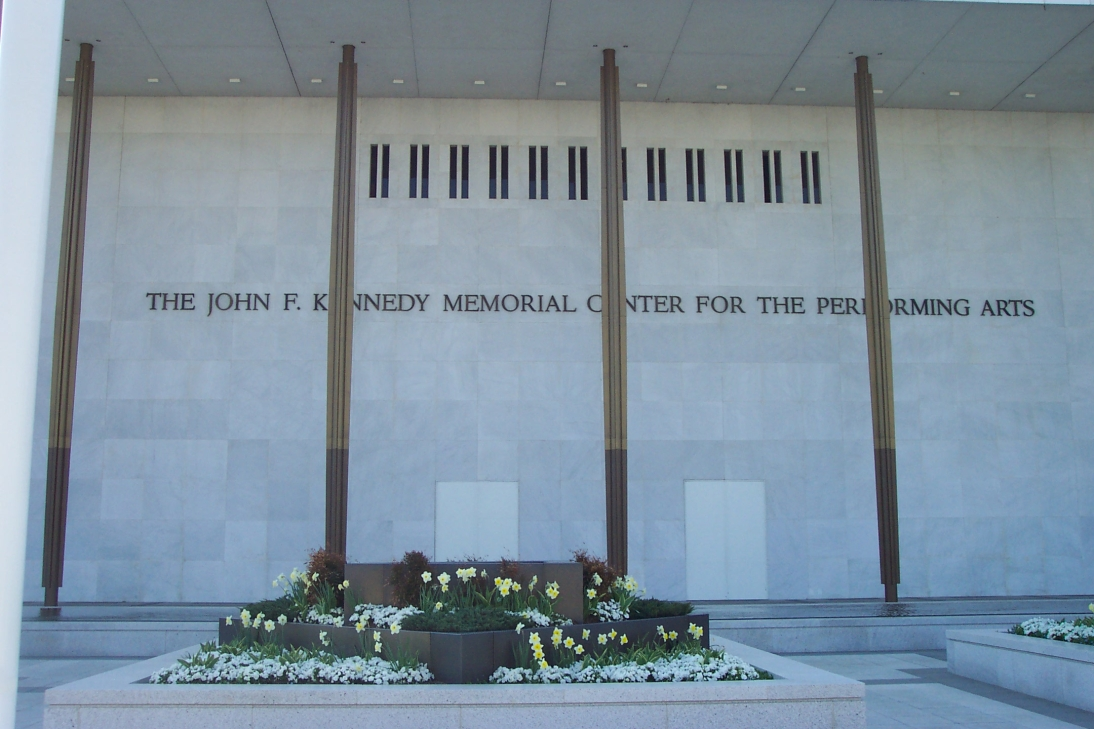
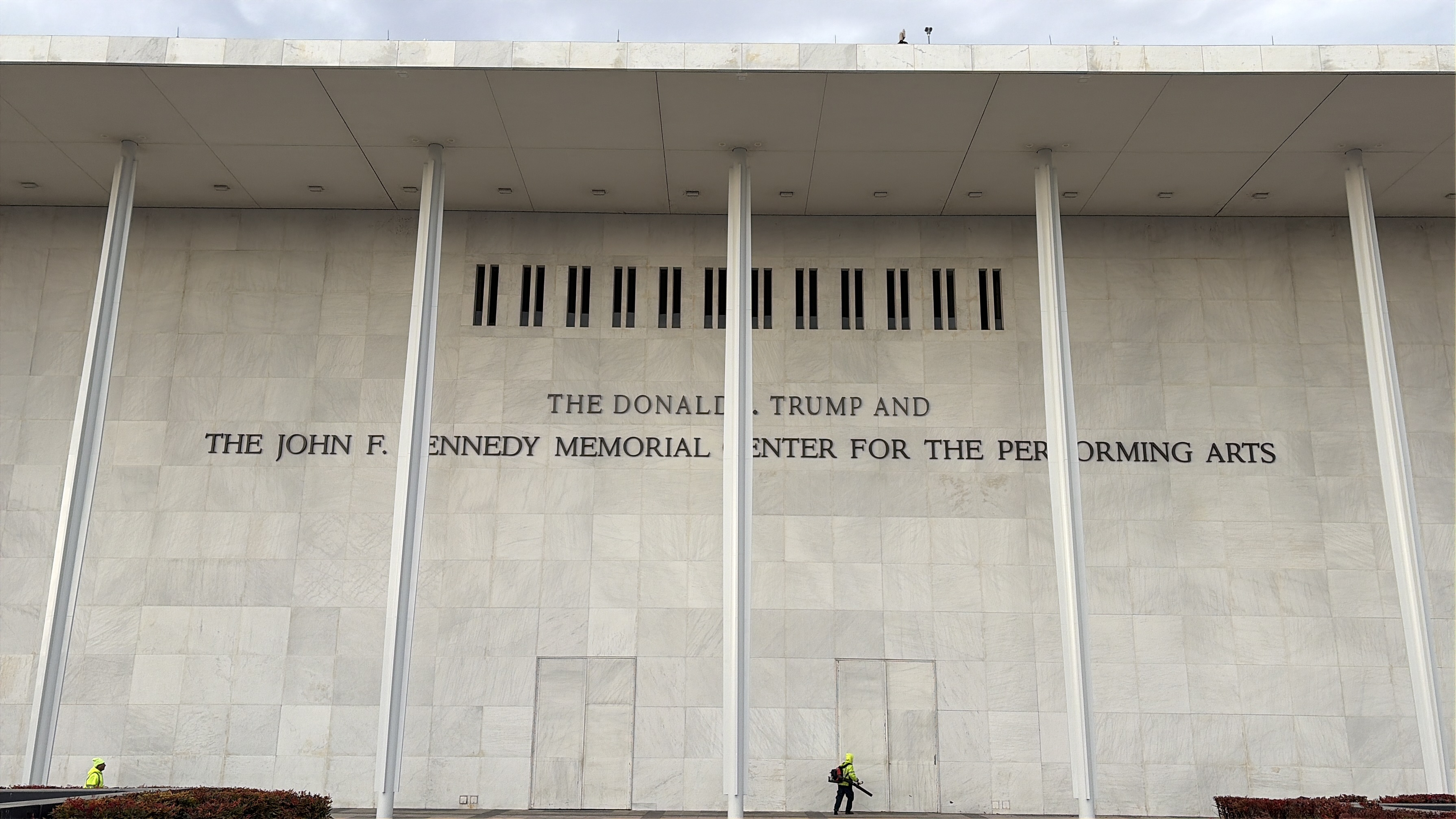
The facade of the Kennedy Center before (top) and after (bottom) the 2025 addition of Donald Trump's name

On December 18, 2025, the Trump administration announced that the board of trustees for the John F. Kennedy Center for the Performing Arts—a new board mostly handpicked by Trump and chaired by Trump himself—voted unanimously to change the institution's name to The Donald J. Trump and the John F. Kennedy Memorial Center for the Performing Arts. The unanimous nature of the vote has been disputed, as the board's bylaws had been recently revised so that board members designated by Congress could no longer vote. One of those members, Joyce Beatty, stated that she was muted on the call when she tried to object to the proposal.

The legality of the name change was also questioned, since the center is detailed in congressional legislation specifically designating the site as the John F. Kennedy Center for the Performing Arts. "The Kennedy Center Board has no authority to actually rename the Kennedy Center in the absence of legislative action", said House Democratic leader Hakeem Jeffries.

The day after the vote, the new name was installed on the outside of the building. John F. Kennedy's niece, Kerry Kennedy, reacted on social media saying "three years and one month from today, I'm going to grab a pickax and pull those letters off that building".

According to confidential documents obtained by the Washington Post, ticket sales and fundraising both plummeted after the name change. Reviewing the documents, the director of American University's arts management program described the declines as "a nosedive."

On December 22, 2025, Beatty sued Trump and the newly appointed members of the board, saying the vote was a "thinly-veiled sham" and the renaming of the center violates federal law.

On February 27, 2026, the newly appointed president of the center Richard Grenell announced that the annual event known as the Kennedy Center Honors will be renamed the "Trump Kennedy Center Honors".

On May 29, 2026, a federal judge deemed the renamed center as illegal, and ordered the removal of all Trump signage. Trump's name was removed from the building by mid-June 2026.

On September 15, 2026, the same judge rejected a second attempt by the board to put Trump's name on the center, this time rejecting a proposal to add "renovated and restored by President Donald J. Trump." to the building's signage. Judge Christopher Cooper called the new proposal "linguistic gymnastics." Trump said later that day that if the decision is not repealed and his name is not allowed on the building, then a proposed $257 million renovation of the center will not take place.

== New programs ==
=== Trump accounts ===
The One Big Beautiful Bill Act (OBBBA) of 2025 and the associated section of the Internal Revenue Code (IRC) that it created refer to the children's investment accounts created by the OBBBA as "Trump accounts". To try to avoid the political overtones of the official name, the accounts have sometimes been referred to as 530A accounts, in reference to the section of the IRC that defines the accounts. The accounts were known by at least two other names before being enacted into law. Initially conceived as Invest America accounts, the name was changed to "MAGA accounts", a backronym for "money accounts for growth and advancement", on its way to the House Ways and Means committee. The name was then changed to Trump accounts at the last minute as the bill was finalized by Republicans in the House of Representatives. According to The Wall Street Journal, president Donald Trump's association with the name of the accounts may dissuade some families from participating in the accounts. The accounts are created using IRS "Form 4547", named after Trump's 45th and 47th presidential terms.

=== Trump-class battleship ===
On December 22, 2025, Trump announced that the Navy would commission a new type of battleship, dubbed "Trump-class" ships. The term "Trump-class" would not be in line with current United States ship naming conventions which state that ships are to be named after states, rivers and towns. Although those standards have been relaxed to name aircraft carriers after presidents, that convention has previously only been used for former presidents, not current.

=== TrumpRx ===
On September 30, 2025, Donald Trump announced plans to create a government website to sell pharmaceuticals to the public at discounted prices, to be named TrumpRx. The site launched in February 2026, relying largely on prices already available at the discount pharmaceutical marketplace GoodRx. At launch, a YouGov survey found far more support for the new website if it was not called TrumpRx: 57% approve and 19% disapprove. When surveying with the name TrumpRx, approval dropped 16 points to 41% and disapproval rose to 31%.

=== Gold card ===
On September 19, 2025, Trump signed Executive Order 14351 establishing a new visa for people willing to pay $1 million to enter the U.S., or whose employers are willing to pay the U.S. $2 million to sponsor them. The text of the executive order only refers to the visa as a "gold card", though as early as February 2025, Trump was using his name to refer to the program. "Remember the words: the gold card", he said in an Oval Office press conference. "Somebody said, 'Can we call it the Trump gold card?' I said: 'If it helps, use the name Trump. I'll give it to you for free.'"

When the program was officially launched in December 2025 at trumpcard.gov, the website referred to the visa as the "Trump Gold Card", and displayed a mock up of the physical card embossed with Trump's photo.

=== Boeing F-47 ===
The Boeing F-47 is a sixth-generation fighter jet currently being developed for the United States Air Force as part of the Next Generation Air Dominance (NGAD) program. The Air Force states that the "47" designation pays tribute to the Republic P-47 Thunderbolt and the year the Air Force was established (1947), as well as to Trump's status as the 47th president, stating that his backing is crucial for the program. In a March 2025 announcement of the plane from the Oval Office, Trump said "It'll be known as the F-47. The generals picked the title. It's a beautiful number." Freedom of Information Act requests revealed that an Air Force statement explaining the F-47's name was hastily drafted right after the Oval Office announcement took place.

The F-47 is expected to make its first flight before the end of Trump's second term. In 2026, Trump said "I don't know why they called it 47... But if I don't like it, I'm going to take that 47 off."

== Use of Trump's image ==
=== America the Beautiful Pass ===
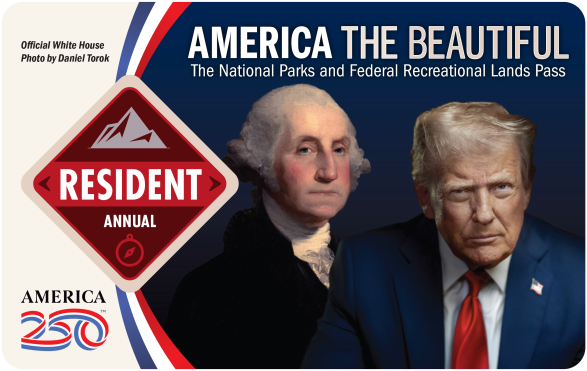
2026 annual resident America the Beautiful Pass, showing Donald Trump's official portrait and George Washington

In November 2025, the United States Department of the Interior announced that its America the Beautiful Pass, used for entry to certain National Park Service sites and other federal recreation areas, would bear a portrait of Trump rather than the traditional practice of using nature photography. In response, the Center for Biological Diversity sued the federal government, claiming that the use of a portrait of Trump violated the Federal Lands Recreation Enhancement Act of 2004, which requires a competition to select a photograph and disallows controversial imagery.

In December 2025, artist Jenny McCarty of Boulder, Colorado, began selling stickers of her own National Park-inspired artwork to be placed over Trump's image. In January 2026, the Department of the Interior updated its internal guidance, stating that placing stickers on the face of a pass would cause it to become invalid: "defacing the pass in any way, including writing on it or adding stickers or other coverings, is a form of altering the pass". By the time of the new guidance, McCarty had sold over 7,000 stickers and continued to do so after the guidance change, advising customers to bypass the policy by placing the stickers on a plastic sleeve instead of the pass itself. On January 23, 2026, the San Francisco Chronicle reported that several artists had begun selling similar stickers and sleeves.

=== Banners on federal buildings ===
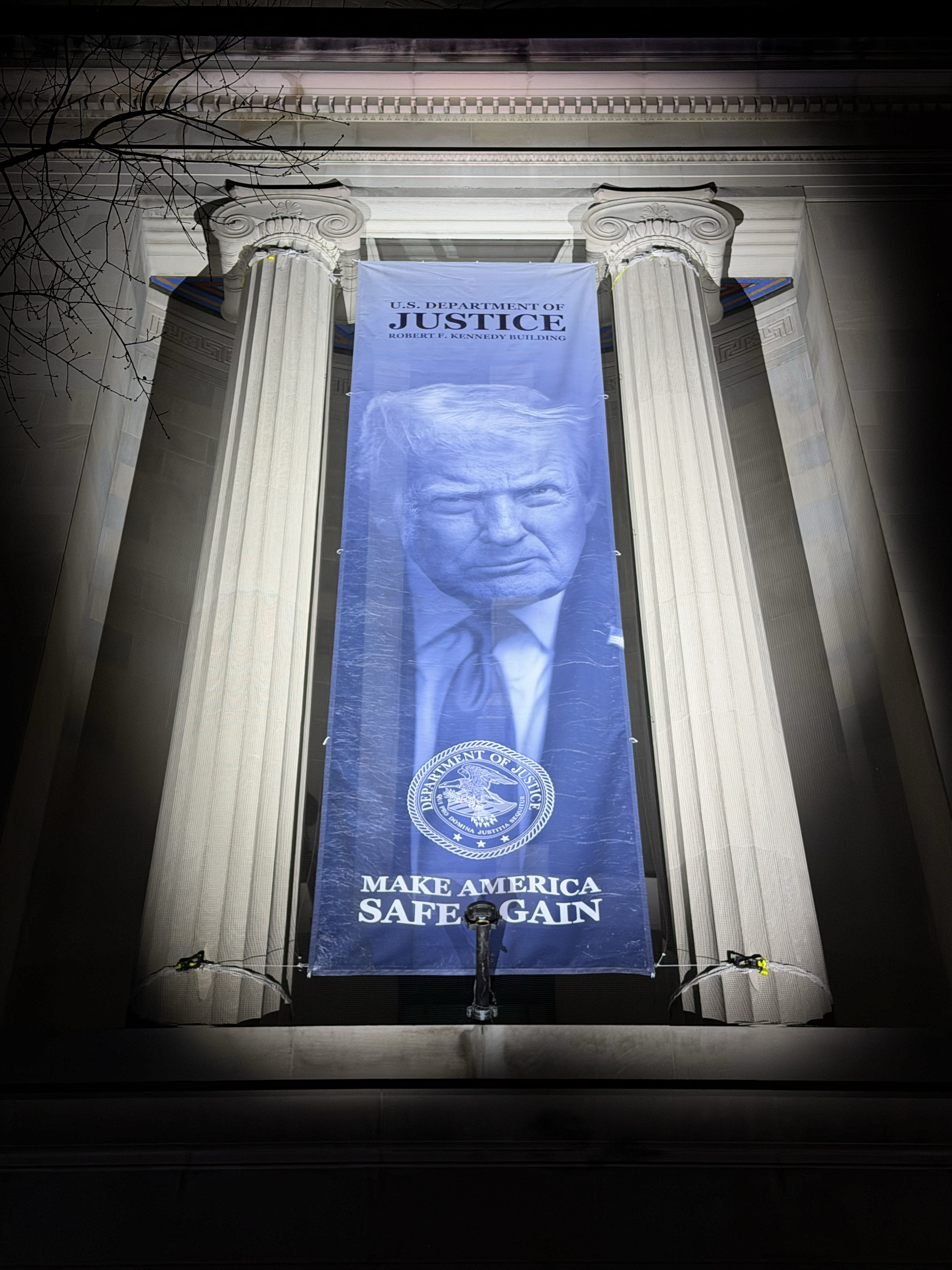
Banner hanging at the Robert F. Kennedy Department of Justice Building in February 2026

In May 2025, large banners with portraits of Donald Trump and Abraham Lincoln were hung on the outside of the United States Department of Agriculture Administration Building. The USDA told Bloomberg News reporter Jason Leopold that the banners were intended to be temporary, and they were removed by August 15, 2025. A similar banner was hung on the Department of Labor building on August 25, 2025. In February 2026, another banner was hung on the Robert F. Kennedy Department of Justice Building.

Senator Adam Schiff published a report in September 2025 claiming that the banners had cost in excess of $50,000 and were in violation of federal law, comparing them to the Mussolini façade of the Palazzo Braschi and the Kim Il Sung and Kim Jong Il portraits.

=== Passports ===
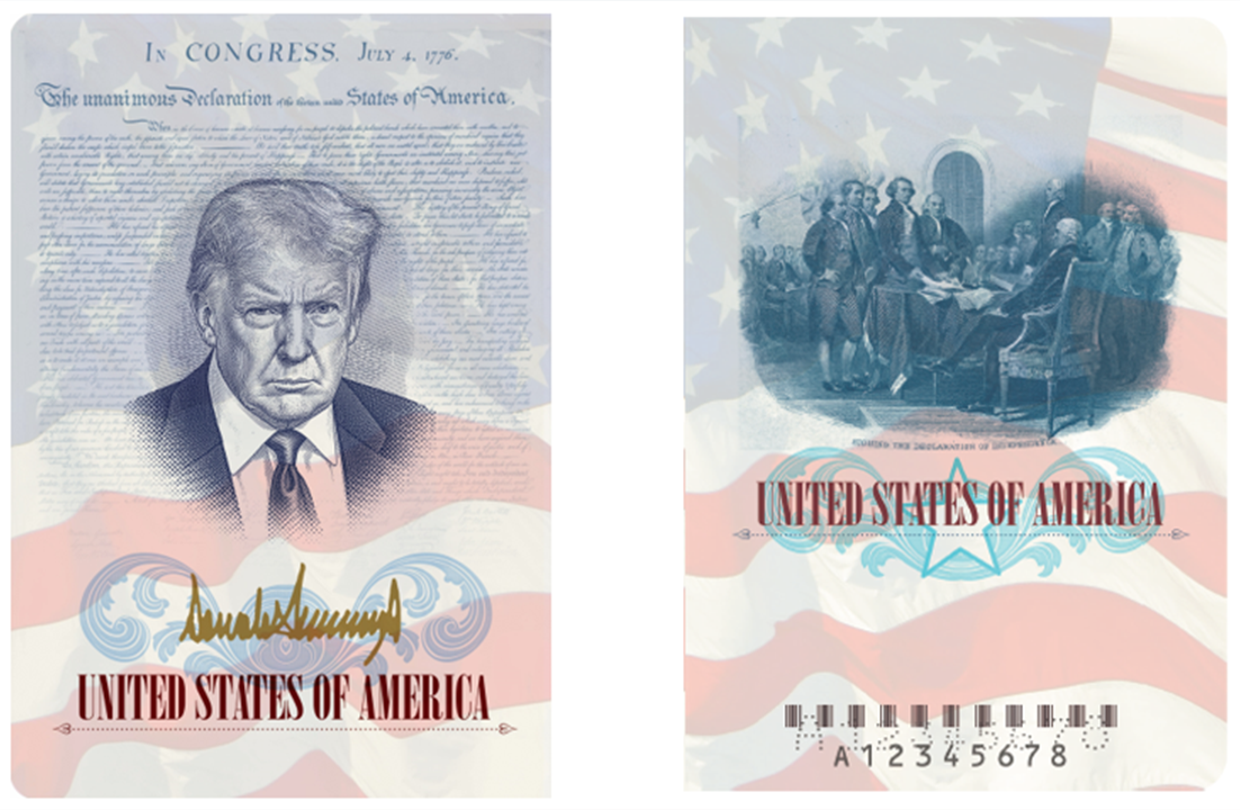
Inner cover of the United States passport design for the United States Semiquincentennial

On April 28, 2026, The Bulwark published a news article claiming that the United States Department of State was intending to produce a "limited run" United States passport for the United States Semiquincentennial that would include Trump's face and signature in the inner cover. Soon after the publication, Fox News obtained and published the department's internal mockup for the passport design. This passport will be the default option from the Washington Passport Agency for individuals renewing their passports in person at that location. The issuance of the passport is set to begin in the summer of 2026. On July 30, the State Department announced that passports featuring Trump's image would be branded as "Patriot Passport" and claimed there is "overwhelming demand" for it. The Patriot Passport is scheduled to be issued on August 8, with 250,000 available initially.

== Trump's birthday ==
Donald Trump's birthday, June 14, coincides with Flag Day. In 2025, the Department of the Interior announced that National Park Service locations would grant free admission in 2026 on "Flag Day/President Trump's birthday", citing "Trump's commitment to making national parks more accessible, more affordable and more efficient for the American people". The announcement, which also removed fee-free access on Martin Luther King Jr. Day and Juneteenth, was criticized by the NAACP as an attempt to minimize African-American history.

== Attempted namings ==
=== Penn Station and Dulles International Airport ===
At the start of the 2025 United States federal government shutdown, the Trump administration suspended funding for two public transit tunnel construction projects in New York City: $16 billion for tunnels connecting New Jersey to Manhattan known as the Gateway Program and $2 billion for expansion of the Second Avenue Subway. At the time, the reason given was a review of "unconstitutional DEI principles". Two weeks later in a news conference, Trump announced without explanation that the Gateway Program had been "terminated". Later reporting revealed that Trump pressured New York senator and Senate Minority leader Chuck Schumer to name New York Penn Station and Dulles International Airport after Donald Trump in exchange for the release of the funding. Trump denied making the offer, saying it was freely offered by Schumer – a claim Schumer called an "absolute lie. He knows it. Everyone knows it". Four days later, White House Press Secretary Karoline Leavitt confirmed Trump's offer, saying "about renaming, why not? It is something the President floated in his conversation with Chuck Schumer". On February 6, 2026, a Federal judge issued a temporary order requiring the release of the funding while litigation continues.

=== New Stadium at RFK Campus ===
On November 8, 2025, ESPN reported that Trump had asked the owners of the Washington Commanders NFL team to name their New Stadium at RFK Campus after himself. The proposed stadium site is owned by the federal government and leased to the Government of the District of Columbia; as such, development is controlled by the federal National Capital Planning Commission. "Trump has plenty of cards to play to get his way", said a source with knowledge of the offer, referring to Trump's control of the federal agencies needed to approve environmental and land-use issues at the building's location. As of February 2026, the team's ownership has declined to comment on the proposal.

== Responses ==
=== Cult of personality ===
Presidents seldom have their names memorialized in this manner. Trump is the first sitting president to have a building named after himself. His use of presidential authority to name programs after himself has been described as a cult of personality in The New York Times and by the director of The American Conservative. The political scientist Austin Sarat wrote in an opinion article that such renamings are "in keeping with what strongmen do when they take power," but noted that uptake of the new names in media and colloquial speech may be unlikely. David A. Graham, a staff writer at The Atlantic magazine, argued that Trump seemed to be promoting himself as a father figure or "daddy of the nation." The political philosopher Jan-Werner Müller similarly argued of Trump's actions that the historically unprecedented prevalence in the American public sphere of a sitting president’s name and likeness is intended to further a personality cult, in order to bind his political coalition by delegitimizing failure and opposition to his power and making his office a "royal court" for his loyalists and flatterers.

=== Legal analysis ===
David Super, a law professor, argues that the Kennedy Center renaming is illegal, citing the original name as explicitly spelled out in federal statute, but noting that there may be no one with standing in court to sue over it. Professor of Mass Communication Jason Zenor has argued that these names fall under the "government-speech doctrine", a precedent set by the Supreme Court of the United States that permits governments to have the same free speech rights as natural persons.

== See also ==
- American expansionism under Donald Trump
- Denali–Mount McKinley naming dispute
- Gulf of Mexico naming dispute
- Lake Ontario naming dispute
