= South American Biker Gangs =

South Park season 29, episode 1

- South Park episode
- Episode no.: Season 29; Episode 1
- Directed by: Trey Parker
- Written by: Trey Parker
- Production code: 2901
- Original air date: September 16, 2026

Guest appearance
- Mike Judge as Kenny's unmuffled voice

Episode chronology
| ← Previous "The Crap Out" | Next → "Billionaire Weenietown" |
- South Park season 29

"South American Biker Gangs" is the first episode of the twenty-ninth season of the American animated television series South Park and the 339th episode of the series overall. It premiered on Comedy Central on September 16, 2026. The episode features Eric Cartman, Stan Marsh, Kyle Broflovski, and Kenny McCormick taking over the streets of their neighborhood on newly purchased electric bicycles and electric motorcycles, causing a group of male cyclists led by Randy Marsh to launch a campaign to make the motorized bikes illegal. The episode's premiere was watched by 4.2 million viewers within three days of broadcast.

== Plot ==
In the renamed South America, Eric Cartman begs for an electric bicycle (e-bike) by tearfully insisting to his mother Liane that he needs one to get in shape to avoid bullying over his weight. He shows off his new purchase to Stan Marsh, Kyle Broflovski, and Kenny McCormick, which makes them envious. Unable to afford their own e-bikes, the boys visit Mr. Kim's shop to buy knockoff e-bikes.

The rise of e-bikes upsets Randy Marsh, a cyclist himself, who wants the e-bikes to be banned from the town. Randy recruits more men to his cause, forming their own biker gang. The cyclists amass members, block traffic, and demand protein packets. After trying to ban e-bikes by bribing the cops with cash and cigars, they attack Mr. Kim's shop and brutally assault him.

In disguise, Kenny approaches Randy's gang and tries to talk some sense into them, explaining that it is only a very small, very fat minority of kids, consisting solely of Cartman, that are making trouble with the e-bikes. Randy invites him to sit down with them, but asks the others to Google how South American biker gangs deal with each other. Shortly afterward, Kenny reports to Stan and Kyle that the negotiations seemed to go well, however Kenny's bike explodes, heavily implied to have been due to a bomb planted by Randy’s group (who were unaware that he was Kenny in disguise, and the boys remained unaware that it was a bomb, thinking a faulty battery exploded), killing him. With the three boys grieving, the biker gang uses Kenny's death as an opportunity to ban e-bikes from South America.

== Production ==
The theme song for the show was updated with new lyrics replacing "South Park" with "South America", and new visuals depicting Donald Trump. The "new name" references Trump signing executive orders changing the name of Lake Ontario to "Lake America" and Gulf of Mexico to "Gulf of America", and "the bravery and patriotism of Apple and Google" for conceding to Trump's name changes on their Google Maps and Apple Maps platforms. Mike Judge reprised his role as Kenny's unmuffled voice from South Park: Bigger, Longer & Uncut.

== Commercial performance ==
Only an hour after the episode was launched, the show jumped up to second place for the most popular show on Paramount+ that night. Within three-days of broadcast, viewership for the episode had totalled 4.2 million viewers, level with the season 28 premiere, but achieved a markedly higher rating and share among the 18–49 demographic.

== Reception ==
Deadline Hollywood said of the episode "They've been doing it since 1997, tonight they showed exactly just how good they still are at it". IGN gave the episode an 8/10 whilst stating "Whether you prefer to call it South Park or South America, Season 29 is off to a pretty strong start. With the focus shifting to Stan and the gang, it really feels like a classic installment of the series in many ways. And despite a rushed climax, it's an approach that works". MS NOW appreciated the jokes about Trump "considering how many anti-Trump comics the president has harangued or flat-out punished".
