= List of geographical naming disputes =

This is a list of geographical naming disputes. Possible solutions to such disputes include geographical renaming, or keeping names as they are.

== Official names ==
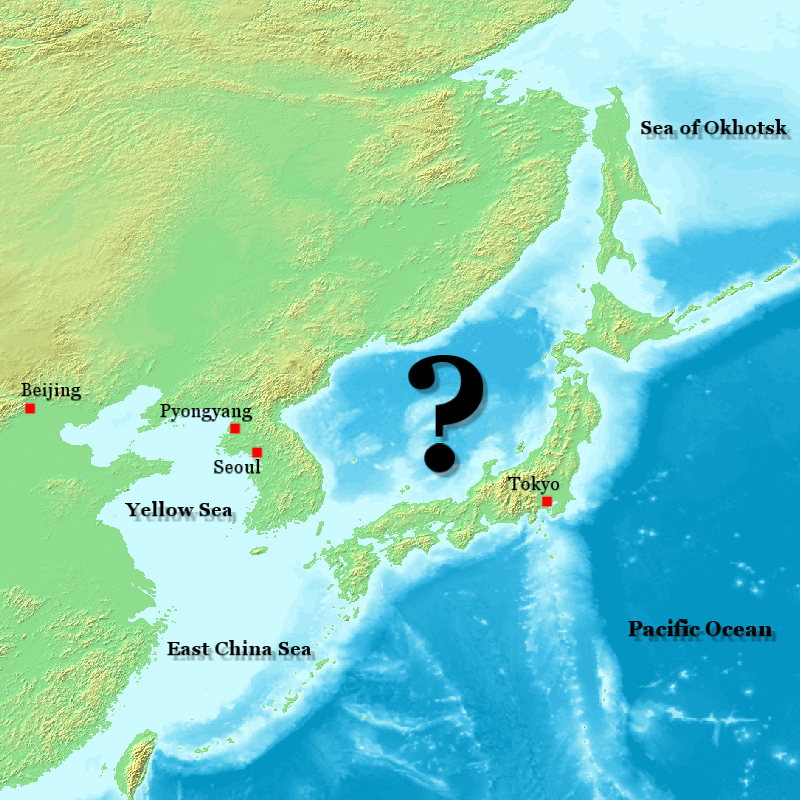
Sea of Japan naming dispute

- Africanization: efforts at indigenization in post-colonial Africa.
- Australian place names changed from German names during WWI
- Azerbaijan naming controversy
- Britain and Ireland naming disputes
  - British Isles naming dispute
  - Northern Ireland: The often-disputed alternative names for Northern Ireland are summarised in 'Northern Ireland' and discussed in detail in 'Alternative names for Northern Ireland'.
    - Derry/Londonderry name dispute in Northern Ireland
  - Ireland: Names of the Irish state. A 61-year-long dispute concerning the country's name ended in 1998.
    - Dingle/An Daingean: The Irish town of Dingle (An Daingean or Daingean Uí Chúis) has been the focal point of a dispute over whether official signposts in officially Irish-speaking areas (the Gaeltacht) should show place names in Irish only, thus possibly endangering income from tourism.
- Berlin to Kitchener name change, Canadian town's name changed during WWI
- Bradford on Avon or Bradford-on-Avon
- Busta Rhymes Island
- Names of China: both the official names of the People's Republic of China and the Republic of China (Taiwan), related terms such as Mainland China, China proper and Greater China, political terms such as "Taiwan Province"'; "Taiwan, China"; "Taiwan Province, People's Republic of China"; Republic of China, and how to translate it into various other languages.
- Names of Chittagong
- Name of the Czech Republic
- Denali–Mount McKinley naming dispute over the peak whose federal name was changed to Mount McKinley in 2025, in Alaska, United States
- Diaoyu/Senkaku Islands naming dispute
- Falkland Islands/Malvinas, disputed between Argentinians and British, see List of Falkland Islands placenames
- Gulf of Mexico naming controversy
- Hyphen War of 1990 – Czechoslovakia or Czecho-Slovakia
- Renaming of cities in India
- Name of Iran: Iran or Persia
- Sea of Japan naming dispute
- Khyber Pakhtunkhwa § Etymology
- Lake Ontario naming controversy
- Macedonia naming dispute, in 2018 resolved as North Macedonia
- Names of Myanmar
- Negro Mountain
- New Zealand place names, see also List of dual place names in New Zealand, New Zealand Geographic Board, Treaty of Waitangi claims and settlements
- Persian Gulf naming dispute starting in the 1960s
- Sønderjylland/Schleswig, disputed between Danes and Germans in the 19th Century
- Naming disputes in South Africa, ranging from streets to provinces. Some (proposed) renamings have been met with opposition (such as the Pretoria/Tshwane naming dispute), and some have been reversed. See List of renamed places in South Africa.
- Southern Provinces or Moroccan Sahara, disputed between Morocco and the Sahrawi Arab Democratic Republic
- Names of the Valencian Community, often in relationship with terms such as Catalan Countries
- West Bank/Judea and Samaria Area, disputed both between Israelis and Palestinians and between political factions inside Israel
- West Philippine Sea

== Pars pro toto and totum pro parte practices ==
Disputes involving the name of a whole entity being used to refer to a part of it (totum pro parte), and vice versa (pars pro toto)

- American (word) for the United States/Americas/North America: The terms 'America' and 'American' are frequently used to refer only to the United States and its people. This sometimes causes resentment among some non-US Americans, especially Latin Americans, who tend to respond by referring to the people of the US as Unitedstatesian (or 'estadounidenses' in Spanish), at least when not using the unofficial term 'gringos'. They can also be called Norte Americanos (North Americans), and this practice is sometimes also followed by native English speakers who wish to show they are sympathetic to Latin Americans, and/or when translating texts into English. The practice can also be found in Mexico, even though Mexico is normally considered part of North America. A Canadian may sometimes be described as 'un norteamericano de Canadá' (a North American of Canada). See also use of the word American.
- Europe/European Union (EU): Just as the terms 'America' and 'American' are frequently used to refer only to the United States and its people, the terms 'Europe' and 'European' are also frequently used to refer only to the European Union and its people, and this similarly sometimes causes resentment among some non-EU Europeans, although the enlargement of the EU means that there are now fewer non-EU Europeans left to take offence than there used to be when the EU was smaller. See also Europe#Definition.
- Partitioned States: When a country is or was divided, the name of the whole is often used to refer to one of the parts, sometimes causing resentment in the other part. The name of the whole is usually used to refer to the larger part, such as 'Korea' for South Korea, and 'Germany' for the former West Germany. Sometimes the term is used to refer to the smaller part for political reasons, such as when the US refused to recognize the People's Republic of China, so that, at least officially, 'China' meant the Republic of China on Taiwan (with 'Red China' or 'Communist China' then being used to refer to the People's Republic of China). Sometimes giving the part the name of the whole is unofficial, and sometimes not. South Korea is officially the 'Republic of Korea', not 'Korea', though, as with many such official names, 'Republic of Korea' can be interpreted as meaning 'Republic of all Korea', (Note: Similarly, because 'Republic of Ireland' can be interpreted as meaning 'Republic of all Ireland', the British Government usually tends to prefer the expression 'the Irish Republic', as do many of the British media, despite the irony that this was the name of the Republics proclaimed by rebels against Britain in 1916 and 1919. A further irony is that Irish Nationalists now avoid saying 'the Irish Republic', partly because it is not the official term, but also to avoid sounding unpatriotic and pro-British despite the anti-British origins of the expression.) and indeed West Germany was officially the 'Federal Republic of Germany', which eventually became the official name of all Germany after reunification in 1990. But 'Ireland' is the official name (in English) of the Republic of Ireland (both according to its Constitution and according to the European Union). (Note: The details of any resulting offence can be complicated: For instance, a substantial minority of Northern Ireland's population (about 23% according to a 2012 survey) regard themselves as 'British not Irish', and are thus unlikely to be offended by the fact that using Ireland to refer to the Republic of Ireland logically implies they are not Irish. But, like the rest of their fellow Unionists, they may still be offended by the fact that this use of the name Ireland still logically implies that the Government of Ireland is entitled to rule over Northern Ireland, despite any explicit claims to that effect in the Republic's Constitution having been dropped by over 94% of those voting in the Republic in the 1998 referendum that endorsed the Good Friday Agreement as part of the Northern Ireland peace process. On the other hand, Northern Irish Nationalists were not offended by such past claims by the Irish Government, but would be offended by any claim that they were not Irish, yet they do not make any major public complaints about that implication of the use of the word 'Ireland' as the official name of the Republic.) Cyprus (officially the Republic of Cyprus) was accepted into the EU as a whole in 2004, although the EU legislation is suspended in the territory occupied by Turkey since 1974 (the Turkish Republic of Northern Cyprus (TRNC), recognised only by Turkey), until a final settlement of the Cyprus problem.

== See also ==
- Lists of renamed places
- Street name controversy
