= South Park season 29 =

South Park
- Season 29
- No. of episodes: 5

Release
- Original network: Comedy Central
- Original release: September 16, 2026 – present

Season chronology
- ← Previous; Season 28

The twenty-ninth season of the American animated sitcom South Park, rebranded South America in response to the Lake Ontario naming controversy, premiered on Comedy Central on September 16, 2026, and will consist of six episodes.

== Production ==
On August 5, 2021, Comedy Central announced that Parker and Stone signed a $900 million deal for extending the series to 30 seasons through 2027. The season falls under the five-year agreement that Paramount signed with Parker and Stone's company, Park County, in July 2025. It replaced their 2021 deal with Comedy Central, ordered 50 further episodes and made Paramount+ the show's streaming home.

Trey Parker and Matt Stone named the start date during an appearance on Jimmy Kimmel Live! in May 2026. Episodes reach Paramount+ the day after broadcast in the United States, Canada and Australia. This season was rebranded as South America in reference to the Gulf of Mexico and Lake Ontario naming controversies.

Shortly before the season began, South Park won the Primetime Emmy Award for Outstanding Animated Program at the Creative Arts Emmy Awards, its fifth award in that category.

== Episodes ==
No. overall	No. in season	Title	Directed by	Written by	Original release date	Prod. code	U.S. viewers (millions)
339	1	"South American Biker Gangs"	Trey Parker	Trey Parker	September 16, 2026	2901	N/A
In the newly-renamed town of South America, Eric Cartman gets an electric bicycle, leading to more kids buying them. Stan Marsh, Kyle Broflovski, and Kenny McCormick all buy cheaper Chinese models at City E-Bike, where Mr. Kim warns that they are likely to blow up in their garages. After being distracted by the e-bikes and crashing into a car, Randy Marsh gets the town's parents to form a gang against the e-bike riders, resorting to more drastic measures such as vandalizing bicycle shops and assaulting the storekeepers, including Kim. Kenny attempts to mediate between the e-bike riders and traditional cyclists, but is killed when a bomb on his e-bike (planted by Randy) explodes. His death leads to the town passing an ordinance banning e-bikes from being used.
340	2	"Billionaire Weenietown"	Trey Parker	Trey Parker	September 30, 2026	2902	N/A
Butters Stotch becomes frustrated when a town in his backyard populated by small, sentient billionaire penises siphons his home's electricity with its data centers. After calling an exterminator, he gets the local news to warn the public that the billionaires are an invasive species detrimental to South America, but the billionaires buy out the news station. While this is happening, the mayor of Weenietown warns his town's citizens to avoid bad publicity by refraining from going on podcasts or voicing their opinions online. He sends his aide Mrs. Ladypenis to form a truce with Butters, who realizes there's nothing he can do about them. After stating he wishes to hear their opinions, he vacuums up the "problem billionaires" and relocates them to Nashville, Tennessee, leaving the other billionaires to quietly remain in South America.
341	3	"You Like That on Your Face"	Trey Parker	Trey Parker	October 14, 2026	2903	N/A
342	4	"Guinea Pig on a Stick"	Trey Parker	Trey Parker	October 28, 2026	2904	TBD
343	5	"We Be Clubbin'"	Trey Parker	Trey Parker	November 11, 2026	2905	TBD
In order to spend more time with Craig, Tweek joins club sports, but it ends being up being a financial pain.
