= You Like That on Your Face =

3rd episode of the 29th season of South Park

- South Park episode
- Eric Cartman after having Sephora makeup applied, referencing The Backrooms
- Episode no.: Season 29; Episode 3
- Directed by: Trey Parker
- Written by: Trey Parker
- Production code: 2903
- Original air date: October 14, 2026

Episode chronology
← Previous "Billionaire Weenietown"	Next → "Guinea Pig on a Stick"
- South Park season 29

"You Like That on Your Face" is the third episode of the twenty-ninth season of the American animated television series South Park, and the 341st episode of the series overall. It premiered on Comedy Central on October 14, 2026.

The episode, which marks the mid-point of Season 29, centers upon the characters Ike Broflovski, Stan Marsh, and Randy Marsh, as they navigate the viral trends of "looksmaxxing" and "aura farming", and endeavor to avoid "cringe" behavior.

It parodies the social media influencer Clavicular, and satirized the cosmetics store Sephora, the horror film Backrooms, and also continued the running gags pertaining to the impending release of Grand Theft Auto VI, and the titular town's rebranding to "South America" as a nod to the geographic naming controversies of President Donald Trump's second term.

== Plot ==
As the schoolchildren at South America Elementary become increasingly concerned about improving their physical attractiveness, they take to "aura farming" and "looksmaxxing", which culminates in fourth grader Kyle Broflovski breaking up an "aura battle" between his younger brother Ike and another student. After fourth grader Chase Chadwick (who is rendered to resemble real-life influencer Clavicular,) challenges Ike to a battle, Kyle's classmate Eric Cartman warns Kyle that if Ike avoids such battles, he may be derided for being "cringe". Kyle's best friend, Stan Marsh, has also become preoccupied with his looks, and takes his girlfriend, Wendy Testaburger, to Sephora, where the saleswomen smear face cream all over children's faces. While there, Stan finds himself in the Backrooms.

Stan's father, Randy, also goes to Sephora after using the same app Stan used, after which he has taken on the appearance of a fourth grader, embarrassing Stan when he becomes one of his classmates. Meanwhile, Cartman decides to help Ike and takes him to Sephora. A saleswoman helps the boys smear face cream all over their faces, but when Cartman balks at the store's high prices and asks for free samples, the saleswoman says he can be given many more if he comes with her to the "back rooms" to meet the manager.

When Kyle learns that Cartman and Ike are at Sephora, he and Stan go there and find the two boys in the back rooms, their faces mutated into a grotesque state. The giant, monstrous manager appears, squirting face cream on the boys from a tube hanging in front of her groin. The frightened boys escape the store, after which Kyle reassures Ike that his face will return to normal, but that in the meantime, he will support him in his battle against Chase. Back at school, when the battle begins, Randy intervenes to defend Ike in an "old school" manner by beating Chase up, after which Mr. Adler takes him to the principal's office.

== Critical reception ==
Ray Flook, reviewing the episode for Bleeding Cool, said the depiction of children's preoccupation with beauty to be "heartbreaking" and "brutal", and found the hellish depiction of Sephora "disturbing", writing, "I'm hating the positions that our kids are finding themselves in during this season of 'South America'. It's like watching these little victories amid these brutally dark and depressing realities. Kyle spent 17 hours in Sephora – but it was only 13 minutes."

Jesse Schedeen, reviewing the episode for IGN, said that the show was "probably the weakest new episode of South Park in several years." Schedeen thought devoting an entire episode to aura farming was not jusitifed, and that it relied too much on the Sephora saleswomen's application of cream on children's faces as a gag that was likened to pornography. Shedeen conceded that the episode harbored some funny moments, such as the revelation of the "Sephora Backrooms", it did not "come together as a cohesive whole."

Jesse Hassenger, reviewing the episode for London's The Guardian, called the juxtaposition of the capitalist graveyard depicted in Backrooms with a busy Sephora's sales floor, and the suggestion of how close the two were, was "inspired" way to comment on tweens' obsession with beauty routines.

John Schwarz, reviewing the episode for Bubbleblabber, gave the episode a 9 out 10, opining that after a series of episodes that he felt too often resorted to "heavy-handed political discourse", the show was now "back in its groove", calling the episode "one of the tightest, funniest 22 minutes Trey Parker and Matt Stone have put together in recent memory," and saying that the series was "at its absolute best when it focuses on the ridiculous, fast-moving absurdities of modern internet culture through the lens of stupid kids and an even stupider Randy Marsh."

Cathal Gunning, reviewing the episode for Screen Rant, lauded the episode's use of the film Backrooms to comment on child beauty trends, writing, "As terrifying as Backrooms was, South Park makes the movie hilarious with this absurd spoof," saying that while the change of the show's name to South America denoted how it continued its lampooning of politics, the episode's plot underscored how some of the show's best episodes were those that parodied popular trends rather than current events. Gunning devoted considerable space to praise the reappearance of the Old Farmer character (who previously appeared in "Marjorine", as a parody of Fred Gwynne's portrayal of Jud Crandall from the 1989 feature film of Pet Semetary). Gunning called it one of the show's "best running gags ever", and illustrated that the show was "just as relevant as it was in 2005", and still able to employ older gags in new contexts.

Kevin Dolak, reviewing the episode for The Hollywood Reporter, said that the episode may have been the "high-water-mark of the season," and thought that Randy's enraged protests as he is taken the principal's office in the show's final shot, was "a great ending to a pretty great episode."
