= Billionaire Weenietown =

South Park season 29, episode 2

- South Park episode
- Episode no.: Season 29; Episode 2
- Directed by: Trey Parker
- Written by: Trey Parker
- Production code: 2902
- Original air date: September 30, 2026

Episode chronology
← Previous "South American Biker Gangs"	Next → "You Like That on Your Face"
- South Park season 29

"Billionaire Weenietown" is the second episode of the twenty-ninth season of the American animated television series South Park and the 340th episode of the series overall. It premiered on Comedy Central on September 30, 2026. The episode centers around fourth grader Butters Stotch as he campaigns against the "billionaire weenies building data centers in his back yard", which is realized literally as a miniature city in his family's backyard populated by anthropomorphic, sentient penises called "Weenies". The episode satirizes the increase of artificial intelligence (AI) data centers and the emergence of billionaires as public media figures, as well as the fact that Nashville, Tennessee has become home to large number of both. The episode also touches upon the Macklemore–Ed Sheeran tour controversy, and anti-vaccine activism.

The episode's final scene uses audio from a self-promotional and controversial midterm campaign ad of U.S. President Donald Trump, who had recently spoken out against calls for stricter regulation on artificial intelligence, and who is depicted in a scene that was noted for its vulgarity, and which The Daily Beast called "the most degrading attack on a president in its 29-year history."

== Plot ==
Fourth grader Butters Stotch is angry over "billionaire weenies" building AI data centers "in his backyard", causing power outages that disrupt his ability to enjoy Dr. Pimple Popper, which relaxes him. His parents, Steven and Linda, who are using AI to remodel their house, tell him that progress is a good thing, and admonish him not to become a "libtard", but as his complaints continue, Steven worries that because Butters received the measles vaccine years earlier, that he may already very well be "libtarded."

It is then shown that the "billionaire weenies" Butters is referring to are literal: a miniature city, in the bushes of the Stotches' backyard, populated by anthropomorphic, sentient penises. Butters consults an exterminator who tells him that while the public has historically ignored billionaires, the ones in his back yard appear to be a particularly aggressive, non-native species whose members like to speak out on social media and podcasts, and that there may be nothing that he can do about them.

Meanwhile, the Mayor of Weenietown attempts to raise awareness among his constituents that the activities of billionaires may be turning society against them. He urges them to not draw attention to themselves by appearing on podcasts or social media, but one of the billionaires gets into a public argument with rap music artist Macklemore.

Butters and the exterminator visit a local news station to raise awareness. The correspondent they speak to is initially dismissive, saying that they should wait until November, when Grand Theft Auto VI is released, and the public will no longer have to worry about anything anymore. After Butters tells the journalist that the power outages caused by the data centers will hinder their ability to play the game, he is spurred to broadcast a report on the problem. However, the Weenies sabotage his report by hijacking the teleprompter used by the network's anchor. When Butters fails to return home by dinner time, Stephen blames Linda for having vaccinated him against his wishes, and fears that Butters may be dead and transsexual.

Butters receives a message from the Weenies, who offer to leave his backyard in exchange for him helping solve their problem. He sets up a microphone with a miniature podium, and goads the Weenies into expressing their sociopolitical views to him. Butters then captures them, puts them in a large jar, and dumps them in a stream in Nashville, Tennessee.

A live-action depiction of U.S. President Donald Trump is then shown, relieving himself in a public restroom stall, as the audio of one of Trump's controversial midterm campaign ads plays in the background. His penis begins to sing "We're in the Money" before detaching from his body and flying away like a punctured balloon, much to Trump's bewilderment.

== Production ==
The final scene depicting President Trump in a restroom was filmed with a Trump impersonator whose face was replaced with deepfake animation.

== Reception ==
IGN's Jesse Schedeen, noting that the episode took a more topical approach after the season premiere's more "classic South Park" story, welcomed the Butters-centered story, finding the character more entertaining when his usual innocence gives way when he loses his temper. However, Schedeen felt that the scenes focusing on Butters' parents worked better than those focusing on Weenietown. Though he acknowledged the "fun" aspect of the animation of the anthropomorphized penis characters arguing over The Joe Rogan Experience, and the show's ability to satirize figures like Joe Rogan without including them as on-screen characters, Schedeen felt that the concept's shelf life was limited, and that the manner in which the Weenietown plot was resolved was too simplistic. Schedeen also found the final Trump scene to be amusing.

Jesse Hassenger, writing for The Guardian, noted how Parker and Stone's 2025 renewal of their agreement with Paramount Skydance, which made them billionaires themselves, did not prompt them to shy away from satirizing their fellow billionaires. Hassenger also noted the "horrifying live-action puppetry" used to depict the citizens of Weenietown, which he said was "a nice (well, kind of repulsive) callback to Parker and Stone's fondness for crude mixed media". He also lauded the episode's "solid running gags". Aastha Raj, writing for The Economic Times, also noted the irony of how the satire in the episode placed its creators within the very economic class they were ridiculing.

Michael Boyle, writing for The Daily Beast, noted how the insistence of characters in the episode that things will "get better" in November was Parker and Stone's attempt to remind viewers that they could change the course of Trump's second term in the 2026 United States elections, and called the final restroom sequence "the most degrading attack on a president in [the show's] 29-year history".

Ray Flook, writing for Bleeding Cool, said the episode illustrated the show's timeliness by way of its references to Macklemore and the then-recent flap associating Kash Patel and bestiality, which arose when Patel was questioned, during his September 15 testimony before the Senate Judiciary Committee, why the F.B.I. removed bestiality as an automatic disqualifier for FBI job applicants. Flook also noted how the episode contrasted the new generation of 21st century billionaires with those of previous eras, who stayed away from being public media figures. Analyzing the points of satire in the story, Flook said that the line "It's South America, kid. No one really gives a shit" was "heartbreaking", and the image of an AI program writing a teleprompter script lauding AI data centers in an empty television newsroom was "painful and effective".

The episode received some backlash online for its alleged use of AI generated visuals besides the deepfake, though some praised this aspect for its ironic humor.
