= Dual naming =

Naming policy; adoption of an official place name that combines two names

Dual naming is the adoption of an official place name that combines two earlier names, or uses both names, often to resolve a disagreement over which of the two individual names is more appropriate. In some cases, the reasons are political. Sometimes the two individual names are from different languages; in some cases this is because the country has more than one official language, and in others, one language has displaced another.

In several countries, dual naming has begun to be applied only recently. This has come about in places where a colonial settler community had displaced the indigenous peoples and started using names in the settler language centuries ago, and more recent efforts have been made to use names in the indigenous language alongside the colonial names, as an act of reconciliation.

== Afghanistan ==
In Afghanistan, the name 'Dari' replaced Persian (Farsi) to refer to the language spoken in the country after the 1964 constitution was adopted; the latter was the only official language until the approval of the constitution in that year. In addition, the government also added Pashto as a fellow official language in Afghanistan.

== Australia ==
In Australia, a dual naming policy is often now used officially to name landmarks that are of significance to local Indigenous Australians, but for which the most common name is European. For example, the landmark with the Pitjantjatjara name Uluru and English name Ayers Rock was officially named Uluru / Ayers Rock in 1993, although in practice, people in the Uluṟu-Kata Tjuṯa National Park refer to it as Uluru.

In the city of Adelaide, the Adelaide City Council began the process of dual naming all of the city squares, each of the parks making up the parklands which surround the Adelaide city centre and North Adelaide, and other sites of significance to the Kaurna people (the "Adelaide tribe") in 1997. The naming process, which assigned an extra name in the Kaurna language to each place, was mostly completed in 2003, and the renaming of 39 sites finalised and endorsed by the council in 2012. Examples include Victoria Square / Tarntanyangga, Rymill Park / Murlawirrapurka, and River Torrens / Karrawirra Parri.

The Cocos (Keeling) Islands had their official dual name attested from 1916; it was made official with the Cocos (Keeling) Islands Act 1955.

== Finland ==
In Finland, many towns have two names, one in Finnish and one in Swedish (the two official languages of the country). The two names are considered equally correct but are not used as a formal duality of names.

== Switzerland ==
Biel/Bienne in Switzerland, whose population is divided between German-speakers and French-speakers, has an official name that is combination of its traditional German (Biel) and French (Bienne) names.

== Hong Kong ==
During British colonial rule in Hong Kong, some places were given new names in English while officially retaining the original names in Chinese (given here with their Cantonese pronunciation). The English and Chinese could have completely different etymologies. For example, Stanley is known as 赤柱 (Chek Chyúh, "Red Pillar") and Queensway is known as 金鐘道 (Gām Jūng Douh, "Golden Bell Road") in Chinese. Nonetheless, the English names of some places were calques of their Chinese equivalents. For example, Sandy Ridge is known as 沙嶺 (Sā Líhng, "Sand Mountain Range") in Chinese.

== New Zealand ==
Some places in New Zealand have dual Māori and English names, such as Aoraki / Mount Cook. The practice of officially giving certain New Zealand places dual names began in the 1920s, but dual names have become much more common in the 1990s and 2000s, in part due to Treaty of Waitangi settlements.

== Northern Ireland ==
"Derry/Londonderry" has been used unofficially to circumvent the Derry/Londonderry name dispute, in which Irish nationalists used "Derry" and Ulster unionists use "Londonderry" for the city and county in Northern Ireland. The "Derry stroke Londonderry" spoken form of this has in turn engendered the city's nickname "Stroke City".

== Romania ==
In Romania, the cities of Turnu Severin and Cluj were renamed Drobeta-Turnu Severin in 1972 and Cluj-Napoca in 1974, respectively, for political reasons, as the communist government wanted to emphasize the cities' Roman origins.

== Spain ==
Another example of the phenomenon can be seen in the name of the capital of the Spanish Basque Country, Vitoria-Gasteiz. This combines the city's Spanish name of Vitoria and Basque name of Gasteiz.

== United States ==
The Denali–Mount McKinley naming dispute and Gulf of Mexico naming controversy are examples of recent dual naming issues in the United States.

== Border geographical features ==
A special problem occurs when the landmark lies on the border between two or more countries. For example, Mount Everest has several different names used locally.

== See also ==
- Bilingual tautological names
- List of dual place names in New Zealand
- Names of places in Finland in Finnish and in Swedish
