= Hyphen War =

Dispute over Czechoslovakia name after 1989

The Hyphen War (Czech: Pomlčková válka; Slovak: Pomlčková vojna, lit. 'Dash War') was the political conflict over renaming the country of Czechoslovakia after the fall of the Communist government in 1989.

== Background ==
The official name of the country during the last 30 years of Communist rule was "Czechoslovak Socialist Republic" (in Czech and in Slovak Československá socialistická republika, or ČSSR). In December 1989—a month after the Velvet Revolution—President Václav Havel announced that the word "Socialist" would be dropped from the country's official name. Conventional wisdom suggested that it would be known as simply the "Czechoslovak Republic", which was its official name from 1920 to 1938 and again during the Third Czechoslovak Republic and the early years of Socialist Czechoslovakia (1948–1960).

However, Slovak politicians felt this diminished Slovakia's equal stature, and demanded that the country's name be spelled with a hyphen, as it was spelled from independence in 1918 until 1920, and again during the Second Czechoslovak Republic (1938–1939). This proposal did not sit well with Czech politicians, as it brought back reminders of when the country's official name had been exactly "Czecho-Slovak Republic" during the 1938 Munich Agreement, in which Nazi Germany annexed a part of that territory.

== Resolution ==
As a compromise, on 29 March 1990 the Czechoslovak parliament resolved that the country's long name was to be the "Czechoslovak Federative Republic," explicitly acknowledging that the country was a federation. The name was to be spelled without a hyphen in Czech (Československá federativní republika), but with a hyphen in Slovak (Česko-slovenská federatívna republika). An informal agreement on the Slovak long-form name was to be codified in a future law on state symbols.

This solution was found to be unsatisfactory, and less than a month later, on 20 April 1990, the parliament changed the name again, to the "Czech and Slovak Federative Republic" (Czech: Česká a Slovenská Federativní Republika, Slovak: Česká a Slovenská Federatívna Republika, or ČSFR). This law explicitly listed the long-form names in both languages and stated they were equal.

This new name broke the capitalization rules of Czech and Slovak, but was accepted anyway as a compromise since generally, in both languages, if a proper noun spans multiple words, only the first word is capitalized, unless one of the other words is its own proper noun. Thus descriptive words such as "federative" and "republic" in country names are generally not capitalized. At the same time, adjectives derived from proper nouns are usually not proper nouns themselves e.g. české sklo (Bohemian glass) or Spojené státy americké (lit. 'United American states', i.e. United States of America). (Even though a word may be capitalized by the writer as a show of respect, e.g. Jeho Excelence (lit. 'His Excellency').) Therefore, the name would normally be written "Česká a slovenská federativní republika", Česká a slovenská federatívna republika". Capitalizing all of the words in "Czech and Slovak Federative Republic" eliminated the issue around the capitalization of "Slovenská".

Although the character demanded by Slovaks was a hyphen (Czech, Slovak: spojovník), the conflict is named in Czech and Slovak after a dash (Czech, Slovak: pomlčka). Although there is a clear difference between a hyphen - and a dash – in Czech and Slovak spelling (a hyphen is used to mark a connection between two words, while a dash is used in other cases), both Czechs and Slovaks often use the term pomlčka for both. Nonetheless, English-language media generally refer to the conflict as the "Hyphen War".

The "war" was an early dispute between the Czech and Slovak halves of the federation. Over the following two years, more substantial disputes arose between the two halves. In 1992, Czech and Slovak politicians agreed to split the country into the Czech Republic and the Slovak Republic—the so-called Velvet Divorce—which became effective on 1 January 1993.

== See also ==
- Name of the Czech Republic
- Dissolution of Czechoslovakia
