= Lake Ontario naming controversy =

US–Canada geographic naming controversy since 2026

Lake Ontario (New York)

Lake Ontario became the center of a geographical naming dispute when U.S. president Donald Trump issued an executive order directing U.S. federal agencies to refer to it as "Lake America". Issued on August 27, 2026, the executive order requires the U.S. executive branch to use this nomenclature when referring to the lake, and some major online consumer mapping providers have voluntarily made the change for users in the U.S. The order received widespread backlash from both U.S. and Canadian government officials.

== Background ==
Lake Ontario is the easternmost and smallest of the five Great Lakes of North America. It is bounded on the north, west, and southwest by the Canadian province of Ontario, and on the south and east by the U.S. state of New York. The Canada–United States border spans the center of the lake.

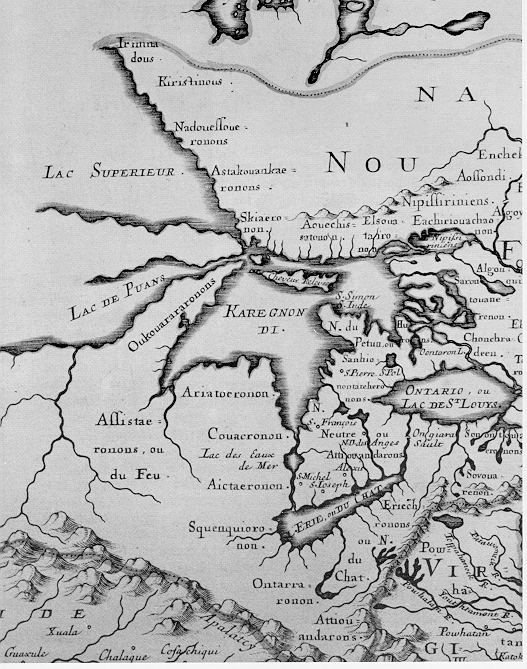
Excerpt from a continental map published in 1650 of Lac Saint-Louis/Lake Ontario by Nicolas Sanson

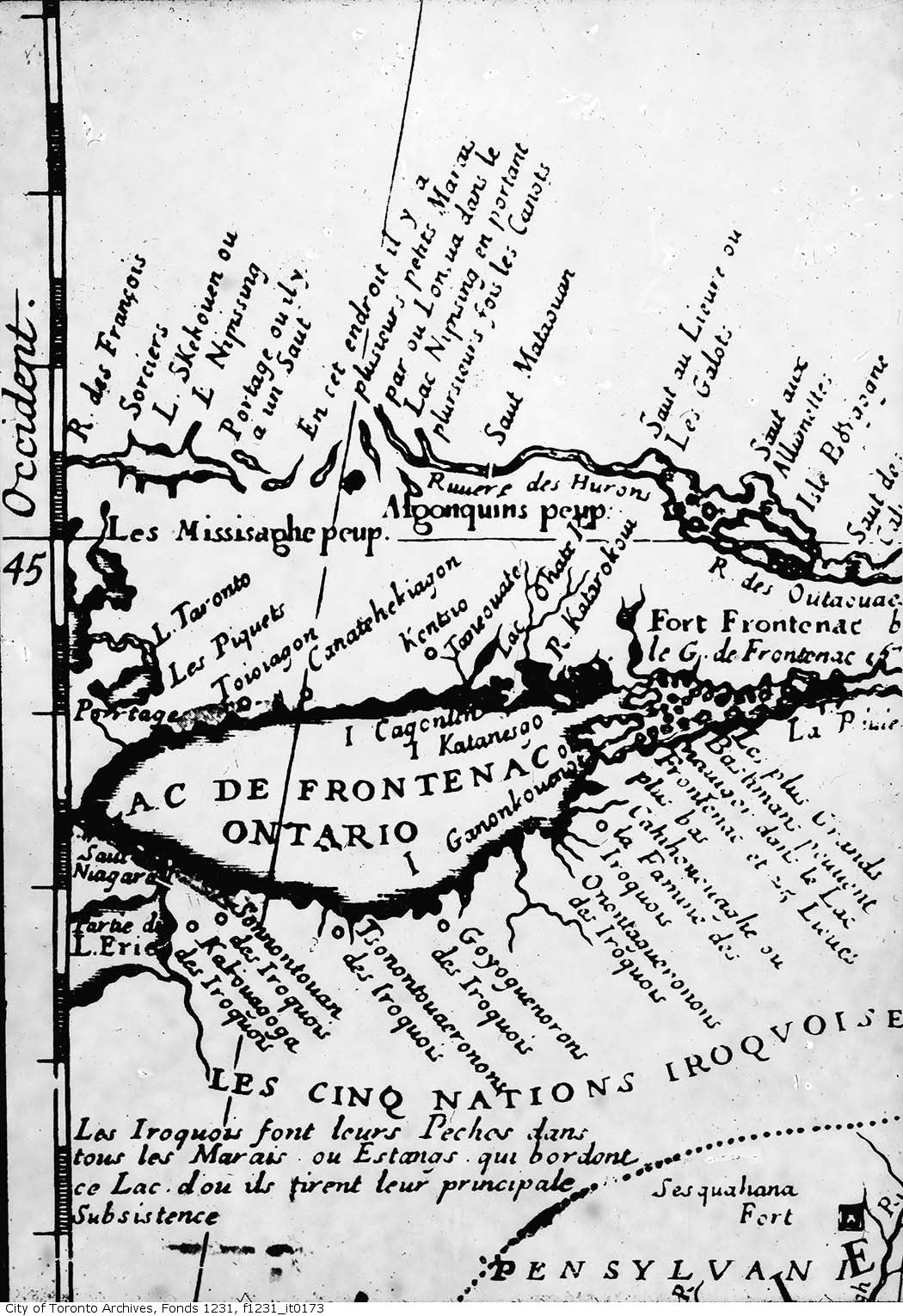
Late 1600s map of Lac de Frontenac/Lake Ontario

The French explorer Samuel de Champlain named the lake "Lac de S. Louis" (in English: Lake St. Louis) in 1632, a name that remained in use in Nouvelle France until the end of the 17th century. Referred to as Lac Saint-Louis and Lac Frontenac and two other names by French colonial explorers during the 17th century, the original Indigenous name of Ontario came to be used more widely by the mid 18th century. Ontario had been in use by European settlers since at least 1641, and appeared on maps by the 1650s. The name Ontario is likely derived from the Iroquoian word Kaniatarí:io or Oniatarí:io meaning "lake of shining waters" or "beautiful lake".

Amid an ongoing trade war with Canada, Trump floated renaming Lake Ontario to "Lake America" on August 25, 2026, two days before his order, posting on Truth Social that "The United States is giving serious consideration to changing the name of Lake Ontario to Lake America in that we don't expect to be doing much business with Ontario any longer" and a picture of Lake Ontario as "Lake America" on a map of the Great Lakes. On January 20, 2025, Trump had issued Executive Order 14172, ordering federal agencies to refer to the Gulf of Mexico as the "Gulf of America".

A 1989 US–Canada agreement on the coordination of names for shared geographical features stated that it was "highly desirable to retain established official names" and that a name change could be considered "for purpose of conformance to strong local usage or citizen preference, or on special request with strong specific reasons".

== Executive order ==
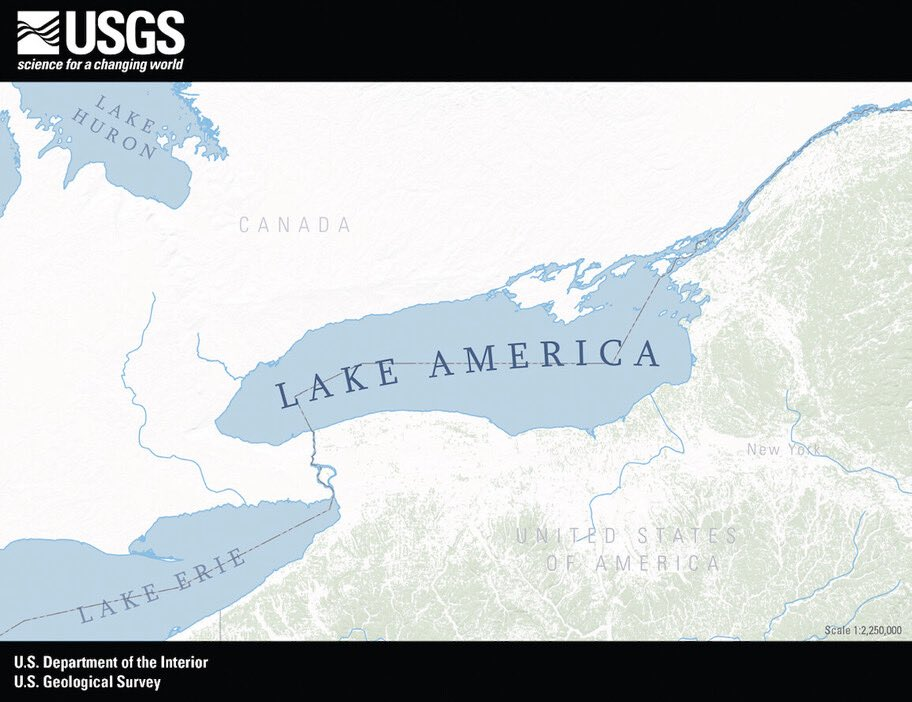
A modified U.S. Geological Survey map showing Lake Ontario labeled as "Lake America" following a U.S. federal executive order (White House's social media account, August 2026)

On August 27, 2026, Trump signed Executive Order 14422, titled "Honoring the American History of the Great Lakes and Renaming Lake Ontario as Lake America". The order justified that the name change was "to recognize the extraordinary contributions of the American people and the rich heritage of our history by naming great natural landmarks for our shared achievements", and that the U.S. "claims most of the lake's volume" and is "the greatest protector of the Great Lakes". The order directs Secretary of the Interior Doug Burgum and the Board on Geographic Names to adopt the name "Lake America" for Lake Ontario in all executive-branch communications within 30 days of the order's signing.

The same day, Secretary Burgum issued Secretary's Order 3453, which directed the change to GNIS. Two days later, the National Geospatial-Intelligence Agency made a corresponding change to the entry for Lake Ontario in GEOnet Names Server, the official federal gazetteer for foreign names. A week after signing the executive order, Trump added "Lake America" hats to his website for sale at $55 each.

== Reactions to declaration ==
=== United States ===
Representative Debbie Dingell of Michigan, along with 23 other Democrats, introduced a resolution before the House of Representatives, the "Hands Off Our Great Lakes Act", that would void the executive order and prohibit the executive branch from renaming any of the Great Lakes. Representative Jimmy Patronis of Florida, a Republican, introduced a competing resolution, the "Lake America Act", to codify the renaming in federal law and reconcile it with references to Lake Ontario in existing documents.

Governors Kathy Hochul of New York, Gretchen Whitmer of Michigan, Phil Scott of Vermont, and Tony Evers of Wisconsin denounced the order. Evers shared a video of himself renaming Lake Michigan "Lake Wisconsin" on a restaurant napkin. Many Republicans in Upstate New York opposed the idea. Rob Corradino, the mayor of Oswego, New York, said Trump's trade war with Canada was already hurting the local economy, and feared the name change would only exacerbate issues. The city council of Rochester, New York, unanimously proclaimed that the city would continue to use "Lake Ontario" in all official local capacities. Fourteen members of the legislature of Monroe County, New York, signed a statement opposing the renaming.

In Florida, Education Commissioner Henry Mack directed the Division of Public Schools to update state curriculum standards and educational materials to use "Lake America".

The Associated Press (AP) issued guidance to reporters to continue referring to the lake as Lake Ontario. The AP had previously issued similar guidance regarding the Gulf of Mexico following Executive Order 14172, allegedly prompting the White House to bar the organization from press events (see Associated Press v. Budowich). The Wall Street Journal updated its stylebook to acknowledge "Lake America" in prose and on maps alongside Lake Ontario. AccuWeather followed the National Weather Service in beginning to refer to the lake as "Lake America" in forecasts.

Since August 29, 2026, Google Maps and Google Earth have varied the name displayed for the lake based on device location settings, with Google stating that users in the U.S. see "Lake America", users in Canada see "Lake Ontario", and users elsewhere see "Lake Ontario (Lake America)". Apple Maps also complied with the name change, with Trump having contacted them directly. One tech lobbyist commented "It's not worth it to fight Trump over something so stupid." MapQuest did not change the name, which led to a surge in downloads, topping the charts on US app stores, and over 1.5 million installs in the US and Canada combined. The product team sold apparel and mugs referencing their decision not to rename the lake.

In a satirical response to the naming dispute, South Park creators Matt Stone and Trey Parker rebranded the 29th season of the animated series: "Inspired by the bravery and patriotism of Apple and Google, we are changing the name of South Park to SOUTH AMERICA."

=== Canada ===
Prime Minister Mark Carney spoke against the order, posting on X that "Canadians also know that naming reality means calling it Lake Ontario – then, now and always." Premier of Nova Scotia Tim Houston responded "We're into some real foolishness now. It's Lake Ontario, buddy." Premier of Ontario Doug Ford responded "It's Lake Ontario to Canadians and the rest of the world. Now and forever." On August 29, he unveiled a large sign reading "Lake Ontario, Now and Always" in Grimsby, Ontario, along the Canadian shoreline. In late October 2026, window signs reading "Lake Ontario Always" were displayed on the CN Tower.

In response to the naming dispute, radio personality Dean Blundell quipped that Lake Michigan should be rebranded as "Lake Epstein", drawing attention to and mocking Trump's relationship with Jeffrey Epstein.

=== Indigenous peoples ===
Reactions to the name change by Indigenous peoples who live near the lake have been negative, for multiple reasons.

Donald Maracle, Chief of the Mohawks of the Bay of Quinte, which can be traced back to the Haudenosaunee Confederacy, called the renaming an attack on Indigenous people. "It's a lot of politics involved in the whole trade discussions, and our culture should not be eroded in that process or our rights."

J. Conrad Seneca, president of the Seneca Nation, condemned the renaming for cultural reasons, saying, "The President cannot assert ownership over our culture or erase it through irresponsible political action. His order should be rescinded and the name Lake Ontario should be left as it is, reflective of the Seneca people, other Haudenosaunee nations and all Indigenous people surrounding the lake."

John Kane, a syndicated radio talk show host who is of Mohawk descent, called it an act of colonialism, saying, "We can't separate colonialism from racism, and you know this is a white guy in the White House thinking that he can drop America on anything he wants, and again, it's absurd. It's insulting to the rest of the world, and frankly, it should be considered insulting to Americans." Denise Oelrich, who has Nlaka'pamux and Salish ancestry, told The Kingston Whig-Standard about the history of the name, saying, "It's been Lake Ontario longer than there's been an Ontario, Canada or U.S."

The Mississaugas of the Credit First Nation stated "You cannot rename away our history." In October 2026, the National Congress of American Indians issued a resolution rejecting the rename.

== Polling ==
Renaming Lake Ontario to Lake America (national polls)
Date (2026)	Locale	Pollster	Sample size (Note: Key: A – all adults; RV – registered voters; LV – likely voters; V – unclear)	Margin of error	Overall (Note: Key: Majority approval; Plurality approval; Tie; Plurality disapproval; Majority disapproval)			Democrats	Independents	Republicans
Date (2026)	Locale	Pollster	Sample size	Margin of error	Approve	Disapprove	Unsure	Approve	Approve	Approve
August 28–30	national	Reuters/Ipsos	1,023 A	± 3.5%	14%	63%	22%	6%	8%	33%
August 28–31	national	The Economist/YouGov	1,592 A	± 3.5%	17%	68%	15%	5%	8%	37%
September 3–6	national	Quinnipiac	970 RV	± 3.9%	21%	70%	9%	0%	15%	47%
September 11–17	New York	Siena	991 LV	± 4.2%	19%	74%	1%	4%	15%	48%

== See also ==
- American expansionism under Donald Trump
- Denali–Mount McKinley naming dispute
- Dual naming
- Freedom fries
- List of geographical naming disputes
- Propaganda map
