= Name of the Czech Republic =

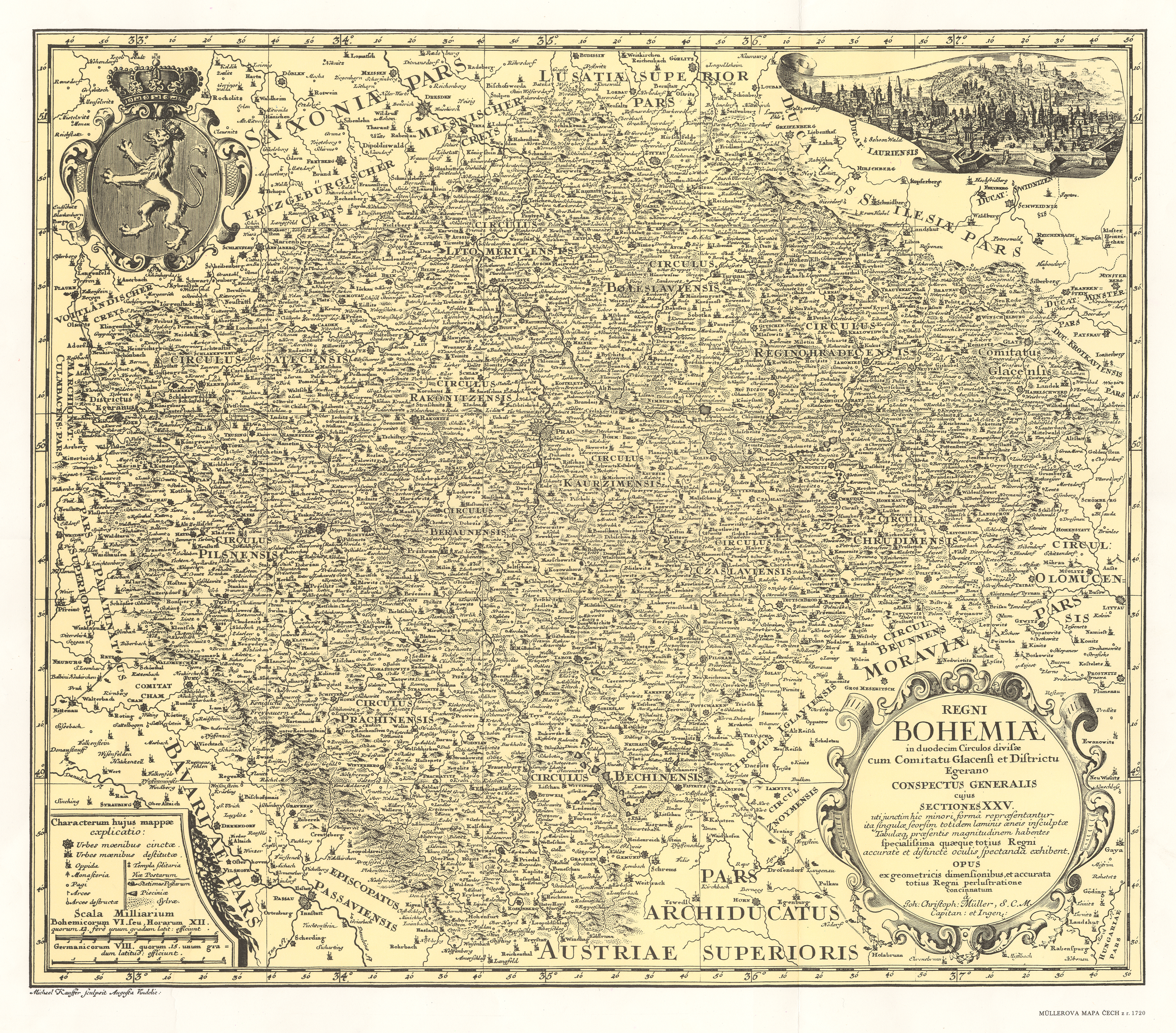
Müller's map of Bohemia (Kingdom of Bohemia), 1720

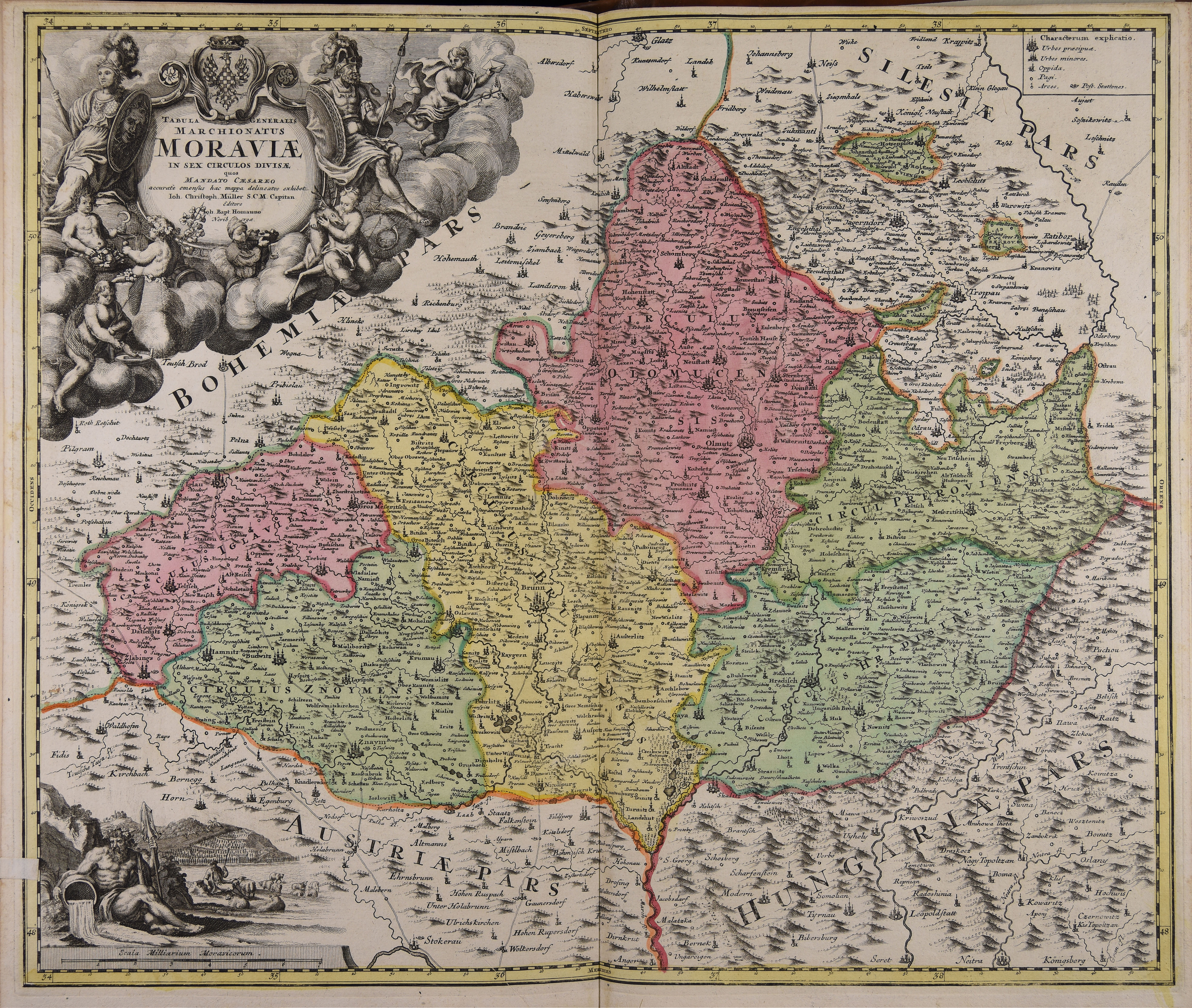
Müller's map of Moravia (Margraviate of Moravia), 1720

The Czech Republic's official long and short names at the United Nations are Česká republika and Česko in Czech, and the Czech Republic and Czechia (/ˈtʃɛkiə/) in English. All these names derive from the name of the Czechs, the West Slavic ethnolinguistic group native to the Czech Republic. Czechia, the official English short name specified by the Czech government, is used by most international organisations.

Attested as early as 1841, then, for example in 1856 or 1866, the word Czechia and the forms derived from it are always used by the authors synonymously with the territory of Bohemia (Kingdom of Bohemia at that time).

The Czech name Čechy is from the same root but means Bohemia, the westernmost and largest historical region of modern Czechia. The name Bohemia is an exonym derived from the Boii, a Celtic tribe inhabiting the area before the early Slavs arrived. The Lands of the Bohemian Crown (1348–1918) were part of the Holy Roman Empire; often called "the Czech lands", they sometimes extended further, to all of Silesia, Lusatia, and various smaller territories. The Czech adjective český means both "Czech" and "Bohemian". The Czech Republic itself is sometimes informally and erroneously referred to as Czech, misinterpreting the adjective in its name as a noun.

The Czech Republic's official formal and short names in Czech were decided at its creation after the dissolution of Czechoslovakia in 1992.

== Czech-language name ==
The country is named after the Czechs (Czech: Češi), a Slavic tribe residing in central Bohemia that subdued the surrounding tribes in the late 9th century and created the Czech/Bohemian state. The origin of the name of the tribe itself is unknown. According to legend, it comes from their leader Čech, who brought them to Bohemia. However, the etymological origin and meaning of the ethnonym is uncertain. There were proposed several derivations, of which most common consider it a hypocoristic of a root čel- (čeleď meaning "family", člověk meaning "person", hence a "member of the people, kinsman"; itself deriving from Indo-European root *kel-/kol for "clan, generation") with hypocoristic suffix "-ch"; a hypocoristic of a personal name with root "Če" (*Čьstьslavъ > Čestislav, Česlav) with hypocoristic suffix "-ch"; from a toponym word "čachy/čechy" ("dry place"); from *čechati, *česati (meaning "comb, scrub, beat" and as such a "warrior"); from a word "čeh" (shepherd, boy).

=== Varieties ===
Several variants of the name have been used over the centuries, due to the evolution of the Czech language. The digraph "cž" was used from the time of the 16th-century Bible of Kralice until the reform of 1842, being eventually replaced by "č" (changing Cžechy to Čechy). In the late 19th century the suffix for the names of countries changed from -y to -sko (e.g. Rakousy → Rakousko for Austria, Uhry → Uhersko for Hungary). While the notion of Česko appears for the first time in 1704, it only came into official use in 1918 as the first part of the name of the newly independent Czechoslovakia (Česko-Slovensko or Československo) . Within that state, the Czech Socialist Republic (Česká socialistická republika, ČSR) was created on 1 January 1969. On 6 March 1990 the Czech Socialist Republic was renamed the Czech Republic (Česká republika, ČR). When Czechoslovakia broke up in 1993, the Czech part of the name was intended to serve as the name of the Czech state. The decision started a dispute as many perceived the "new" word Česko, which before had been only rarely used alone, as harsh sounding or as a remnant of Československo. The older term Čechy was rejected by many because it was primarily associated with Bohemia proper and to use it for the whole country was seen as inappropriate. The negative attitude against the designations Čechy, Česko and Czechia for the territory of the Czech Republic, which also includes the territory of Moravia and Czech Silesia, exactly disagreement, is especially prominent among the inhabitants of Moravia, but not only among them.

The use of the word "Česko" within the country itself has increased in recent years. (Note: According to the official Czech list of country names: "Česko is a standardized one-word name of the state, which is officially named Česká republika according to its constitution".) During the 1990s, "Česko" was rarely used and viewed as controversial. Some Czech politicians and public figures (e.g. media magnate Vladimír Železný) expressed concern about the non-use of Česko and Czechia. Václav Havel claimed that "Slugs crawl on me a little whenever I read or hear the word [Česko]." In 1997, the Civic Initiative Czechia was formed by linguists and geographers in Brno to promote the use of Czechia. The following year, a conference of professionals aimed at encouraging the use of the name was held at Charles University in Prague. The Czech Senate held a session on the issue in 2004.

== English-language name ==
The historical English name of the country is Bohemia, derived ultimately from Germanic Boi-haima, meaning "home of the Boii", a Celtic tribe who inhabited the area from the 4th century BC. The name survived all the later migrations affecting the area, including the arrival of the Slavs and the creation of the Czech state. In the 9th century, the country became officially known as the Duchy of Bohemia, changing to the Kingdom of Bohemia in the 11th century, and the Crown of Bohemia in the 14th century. The Bohemian state included the three historical lands: Bohemia proper (Čechy), Moravia (Morava) and Silesia (Slezsko). From the 14th century until 1635 it also included Upper and Lower Lusatia. The higher hierarchical status of the Bohemian region led to that name being used for the larger country (a linguistic device called pars pro toto), and the people and language of that country were referred to as Bohemian in English until the early 20th century. A number of other names for the country have been used, including Lands of the Bohemian Crown, Czech/Bohemian lands, Bohemian Crown, the lands of the Crown of Saint Wenceslas and others.

The first known usage of the word Czechia in English comes from a book of 1841 by Henry and Thomas Rose, A New General Biographical Dictionary Projected and Partly Arranged.

Shortly before the disintegration of the Austro-Hungarian empire, there were proposals to use the traditional name Bohemia for the newly formed state. However, out of consideration for Slovak national aspirations, the name "Czecho-Slovakia" (later "Czechoslovakia") was adopted instead.

After the establishment of Czechoslovakia, the name Czechia appeared in English, alongside the official name, as a reference to all the Czech lands and to differentiate between the Czech and Slovak parts of the state. It was used at least as early as 4 January 1925; appearing in the article "Literary History of the Czechs", published by The New York Times. The name was used in the Anglophone press before the German occupation of the Czech lands in 1939.

The current English ethnonym "Czech" comes from the Czech ethnonym associated with the area spelled historically as "Cžech" until the reform of 1842, possibly influenced by Latin "Czechus", or the Polish spelling "Czech". The words "Czechian", "Czechish", "Czechic" and later "Czech" (using antiquated Czech spelling) have appeared in English-language texts since the 17th century. During the 19th-century national revival, the word "Czech" was also used to distinguish between the Czech- and German-speaking peoples living in the country. The term "Czechia" is attested as early as 1569 in Latin and 1841 in English (Poselkynie starych Przjbiehuw Czeskych – Messenger of the old Fates of Czechia). There were other early mentions in 1856 and in an 1866 report on the Austro-Prussian War.

== French-language name ==
Cyprien Robert in Le monde gréco-slave (1843), writes, that between Slovakia and Czechia proper, or the Kingdom of Bohemia, lies the Duchy of Moravia, which, along with several Silesian districts, is also an integral part of the territory of the Czech Slavs. The name Czechia is obviously used to refer to Bohemia: Entre la Slovaquie et la Tchéquie proprement dite ou le royaume de Bohème, s'étend le duché de Moravie, qui, avec plusieurs districts de Silésie, fait également partie intégrante du territoire des Tchéquo-Slaves.

== Latin-language name ==
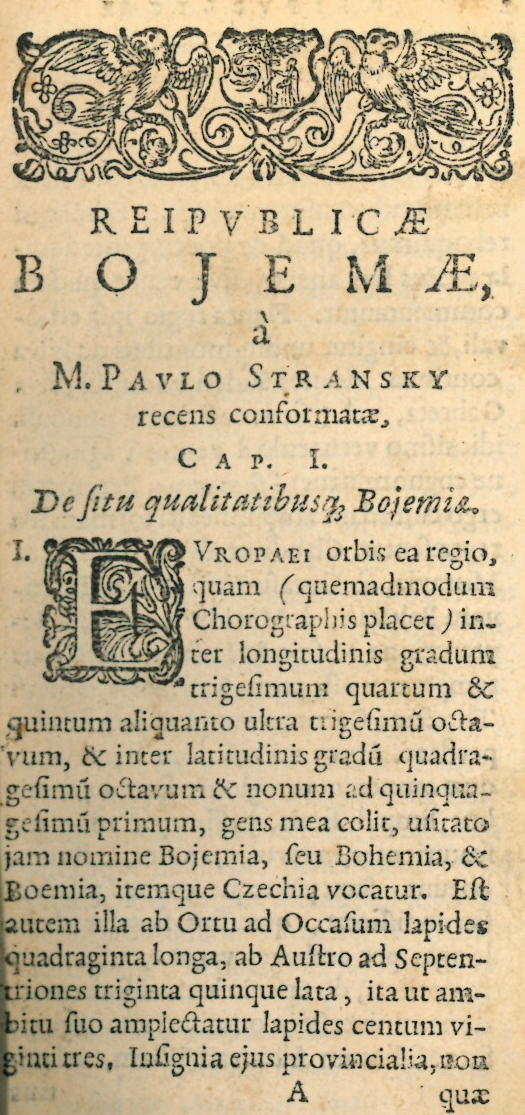
Pavel Stránský ze Záp, Respublica Bojema, 1634: I. De situ qualitatibusque Bojemiae.

Although in Latin the Bohemian lands, that is, the historical regions of Bohemia (Čechy), Moravia (Morava), and Silesia (Slezsko), were referred to by the collective name Bohemia, based on the fact that they were part of the whole "Corona regni Bohemiae" (Bohemian Crown), in the first half of the 16th century Bohemia (proper) was referred to as Czechia, the first historically documented record of which can be found in the Chronicle of Bohemia (Kronyka Czeska) of Václav Hájek z Libočan in 1541. (Václav Hájek did not use the term in the Latin text, but in the Czech text; he used the then-existing digraph Cž, instead of the present letter Č, with i.e. Cžechya.)

In the second half of the 16th century the name Czechia began to be commonly used in Latin and in 1598 Czechia was listed in the Bohemian (Czech)-Latin-Greek-German dictionary published by Daniel Adam z Veleslavína.

Furthermore, the designation Czechia is mentioned, for example, by Pavel Stránský ze Záp in his work Respublica Bojema from 1634, who mentions it already in his first chapter De situ qualitatibusque Bojemiae: "Europaei orbis ea regio, quam (quemadmodum Chorographis placet) inter longitudinis gradum trigesimum quartum et quintum aliquanto ultra trigesimum octavum, et inter latitudinis gradum quadragesimum octavum et nonum ad quinquagesimum primum, gens mea colit, usitato jam nomine Bojemia, seu Bohemia, et Boemia, itemque Czechia vocatur.". In Emanuel Tonner's translation, 1893: On the location and nature of the country of Bohemia: "That country in Europe, that part of the world, in which (as geographers teach) according to the longitude between the thirty-fourth and fifth degrees to the thirty-eighth, and according to the latitude between the forty-eighth and ninth degrees to the fifty-first, the Bohemians (Čechové, Czechs, i.e. Czech people) inhabit, my nation, by its usual name, is called Bohemia (Čechy, i.e. Czechia"). The description includes County of Kladsko, which belonged to Bohemia until 1742 (historical territory of Bohemia). Further east from Bohemia is Moravia.

The Latin name was later adopted into English (as well as the common "Bohemia" in the past).

== Names in other languages ==
In German, the country is called Tschechien or Tschechische Republik, while a Czech person is called Tscheche in the masculine and Tschechin in the feminine, with plural forms Tschechen and Tschechinnen, respectively. The name of Bohemia is Böhmen. An archaic name, (die) Tschechei, also exists (with the -ei sufflix like in Slowakei (Slovakia) or Türkei (Turkey)), having started getting used after Czechoslovakia emerged in 1918. Nowadays, it has a negative connotation due to the use of the term Rest-Tschechei (as in Rest-Tschechoslowakei, "rest/remainder of Czechoslovakia") to denote what was left of the Czechoslovak-controlled territory after the German annexation of the Sudetenland.

In Romanian, the name of the country is Cehia or Republica Cehă, while a Czech is called ceh (masc.) or cehoaică (fem.), with plural forms cehi and cehoaice. Bohemia is called Boemia. In a 17th-century chronicle, Bohemia was called Țara Ceșască (literally "the Czech country"), while for Czechs, an archaic plural form ceși was used. Czechs belonging to the minority in Banat, Romania, besides cehi, are also called pemi, a name derived from "Bohemia", possibly via the German name of Bohemians (Böhmen). Pemi was formerly also used to designate Germans (Banat Swabians) from Bohemia who settled in the area.

== Adoption of Czechia ==
In accordance with Resolution No. 4 I. of the UN conference on the standardization of geographic names (Geneva 1967) and Resolution No. 2 III. of the UN conference on the standardization of geographic names (Athens 1977), the Terminological Committee of the Czech Office for Surveying, Mapping, and Cadaster in cooperation with the Czech Ministry of Foreign Affairs nationally standardized Czechia as the English translation of Česko in early 1993. Other names suggested in the 1990s included Czechomoravia or Czechlands.

In 2013, Czech president Miloš Zeman recommended the wider official use of Czechia in English sources, and on 14 April 2016 Czech political leaders endorsed the short name Czechia in English. The short name Czechia was approved by the Czech cabinet on 2 May 2016 and was internationally standardized by being published in the United Nations UNTERM and UNGEGN country name databases on 5 July 2016.

In September 2016, the British Permanent Committee on Geographical Names (PCGN) recommended the use of Czechia and added it as the sole form of the country name to their list of country names. On 26 September 2016, the International Organization for Standardization included the short name Czechia in the official ISO 3166 country codes list. In November 2016 the Czech Ministry of Foreign Affairs presented recommendations on how to use the short name Czechia in international contexts. On 1 June 2017, the geography department of the Faculty of Sciences of Charles University in Prague organized a special conference to assess the progress of the name's proliferation.

In 2018, the European Union updated its official guidelines and replaced "Czech Republic" with "Czechia" as the short name of the country. The same was done by the Council of Europe.

Multinational technology companies that have adopted the name Czechia include Google, Apple, and Microsoft. The business network LinkedIn updated its locations to Czechia in October 2020.

In 2021, the government of the United States started using the form Czechia instead of Czech Republic as the short name for the country.

The International Ice Hockey Federation updated to Czechia in December 2021. On 28 April 2022, a conference of all sports associations was held under the patronage of the Foreign Ministry at the Czernin Palace. Following basketball, ice hockey, baseball, rugby, and association football, which started to use the short name, all remaining sports agreed to transition to the short name Czechia shortly. The Czech Football Association announced the adoption of the names Česko and Czechia on 24 May 2022.

AP Stylebook updated on 1 July 2022 online entry with the following statement: "Czechia, the Czech Republic. Both are acceptable. The shorter name Czechia is preferred by the Czech government. If using Czechia, clarify in the story that the country is more widely known in English as the Czech Republic."

In August 2022, the exception of keeping the long form of the name on the country plates at the United Nations was dropped and Czechia is since then used on name plates at the United Nations. In September 2022, the UEFA website was updated to Czechia. NATO, the World Bank, FIFA, ISU and the Universal Postal Union switched to Czechia in October 2022.

On 1 November 2022, the Czech Olympic Committee requested the International Olympic Committee and European Olympic Committees to enter the name Czechia into their databases of countries for sports competitions. These were both adjusted.

In January 2023, the Czech Ministry of Tourism updated the website VisitCzechRepublic.com to VisitCzechia.com.

On 10 February 2023, the European Broadcasting Union (EBU), the organisers of the Eurovision Song Contest, began to refer to the country as Czechia with the name being changed on the Eurovision website. This was announced with the release of the Czech entry at the Eurovision Song Contest 2023, upon which the EBU confirmed that the country would be referred to as Czechia at the contest going forward.

The government of Canada adopted the short name Czechia in 2023. Lonely Planet tour guides began using the name in June 2023. OECD and OSCE adopted Czechia in October 2023.

In November 2025, Merriam-Webster adopted Czechia.

In July 2026, Czech Ministry of Foreign Affairs instructed network of Czech Centres around the world to exclusively use form Czech Republic.

In September 2026, The Guardian adopted Czechia on their website.

== See also ==
- Hyphen War
