= Denali–Mount McKinley naming dispute =

Dispute in Alaska, US, since 1975

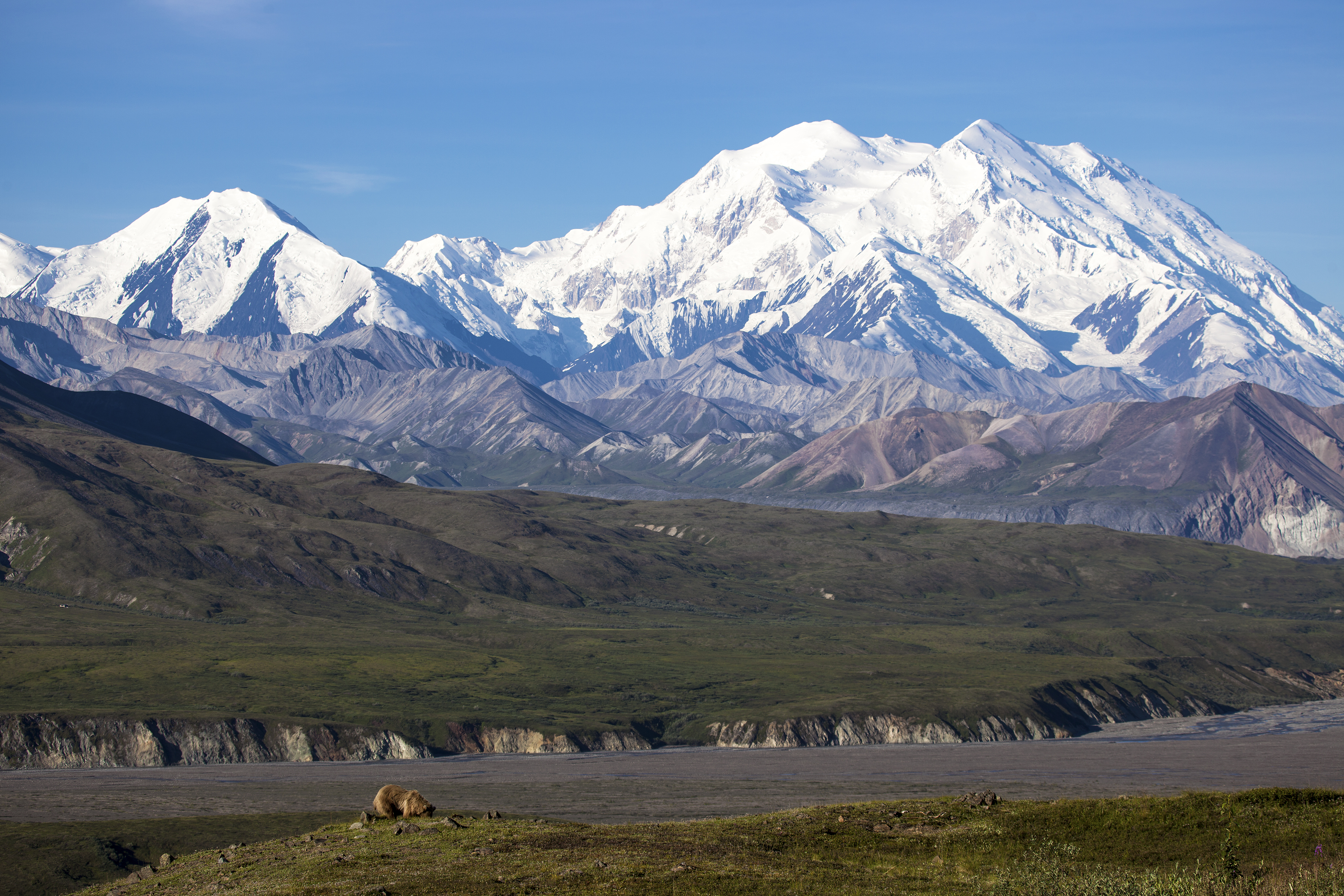
View of the mountain, centerpiece of Denali National Park and Preserve

The name of the highest mountain in North America has been a subject of dispute since 1975, when the Alaska Legislature asked the U.S. federal government to change its designation of the mountain from "Mount McKinley" to "Denali". The name Denali is based on the Koyukon name of the mountain, Deenaalee ('the high one'). The Koyukon are a people of Alaskan Athabaskans (also known as Dena), who settled in the interior area north of the mountain. (Note: James Kari of the Alaska Native Language Center writes in Shem Pete's Alaska, the "name 'Denali' is based upon the Koyukon place name as used by the people north of the mountain." Kari explains that "the name 'Denali' does not mean 'The Great One', as is commonly cited, but is instead based upon this verb theme meaning 'high' or 'tall'".) The mountain had been unofficially named Mount McKinley in 1896 by a gold prospector and officially by the federal government in 1917 to commemorate William McKinley, who was President of the United States from 1897 until his assassination in 1901.

In 1975, the Alaskan government officially recognized Denali as the mountain's name and requested that the mountain be officially recognized as Denali by the federal government, as it was still the common name used in the state and was traditional among Alaska Native peoples. This change action was repeatedly blocked by members of the congressional delegation from Ohio, the home state of President McKinley.

In August 2015, Secretary of the Interior Sally Jewell officially changed the name to Denali in all federal documents. This came ahead of a visit by President Barack Obama to Alaska during the first week of September 2015. The Obama administration's measure was met with immediate criticism from Republican representatives from Ohio.

In December 2024, President-elect Donald Trump stated that he planned to revert the mountain's federal name to Mount McKinley during his second term. Trump's proposal was met with criticism from both of the state's senators. Upon his inauguration in January 2025, Trump signed Executive Order 14172 which led to "Mount McKinley" again being used for federal purposes. The Alaskan government has recognized the mountain's official name as "Denali" since 1975 and continues to do so.

== Historic names ==
Numerous Indigenous peoples of the area had their own names for this prominent peak. The local Koyukon Athabaskan name for the mountain, used by the Indigenous Americans with access to the flanks of the mountain (living in the Yukon, Tanana and Kuskokwim basins), is Dinale or Denali (/dɪˈnæli/ or /dɪˈnɑːli/). To the South the Dena'ina people in the Susitna River valley used the name Dghelay Ka'a ('the big mountain'), anglicized as Doleika or Traleika, as in Traleika Glacier.

The historical first European sighting of Denali took place on May 6, 1794, when George Vancouver was surveying the Knik Arm of the Cook Inlet and mentioned "distant stupendous mountains" in his journal. However, he uncharacteristically left the mountain unnamed. The mountain is first named on a map by Ferdinand von Wrangel in 1839; the names Tschigmit and Tenada correspond to the locations of Mount Foraker and McKinley, respectively. Von Wrangel had been chief administrator of the Russian settlements in North America from 1829 to 1835.

During the Russian ownership of Alaska, the common name for the mountain was Bolshaya Gora (Russian: Большая Гора, lit. 'big mountain'). The first English name applied to the peak was Densmore's Mountain or Densmore's Peak, for the gold prospector Frank Densmore, who in 1889 had fervently praised the mountain's majesty; however, the name persevered only locally and informally.

== McKinley naming ==
The mountain was first designated "Mount McKinley" by a New Hampshire-born Seattleite named William Dickey, who led a gold prospecting dig in the sands of the Susitna River in June 1896. An account written on his return to the contiguous United States appeared in The New York Sun on January 24, 1897, under the title Discoveries in Alaska (1896). Dickey wrote, "We named our great peak Mount McKinley, after William McKinley of Ohio, who had been nominated for the Presidency, and that fact was the first news we received on our way out of that wonderful wilderness." By most accounts, the naming was politically driven; Dickey had met many silver miners who zealously promoted Democratic presidential candidate William Jennings Bryan's ideal of a silver standard, inspiring him to retaliate by naming the mountain after a strong proponent of the gold standard. McKinley never visited Alaska or had any connection to the mountain.

In a United States Geological Survey (USGS) report in 1900, Josiah Edward Spurr refers to "the giant mountain variously known to Americans as Mount Allen, Mount McKinley, or Bulshaia, the latter being a corruption of the Russian adjective meaning big." The 1900 report otherwise calls it Mount McKinley, as does the 1911 USGS report The Mount McKinley Region, Alaska.

McKinley was assassinated early in his second term, in September 1901. This led to sentiment favoring commemoration of his memory, and the U.S. federal government officially adopted the name Mount McKinley in 1917, when Congress passed, and President Woodrow Wilson signed into law, "An Act to establish the Mount McKinley National Park in the territory of Alaska" (Public Act No. 353).

== Alaska State Board on Geographic Names name change ==
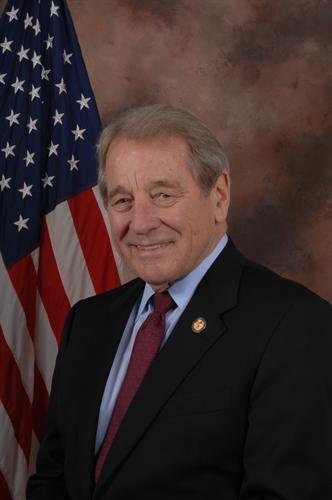
Ohio Congressman Ralph Regula's opposition prevented the renaming of Mount McKinley from 1975 to 2009.

Alaskans, mountaineers, and Alaska Natives have commonly referred to the mountain by its Koyukon Athabaskan name Denali. In 1975, the Alaska State Board on Geographic Names changed the name of the mountain to Denali, and, at Governor Jay Hammond's behest, the Alaska Legislature officially requested that the United States Board on Geographic Names (BGN), the federal governmental body responsible for naming geographic features in the United States, change the name of the mountain from "Mount McKinley" to "Denali".

Ohio congressman Ralph Regula (whose district included Canton, where McKinley spent much of his life) opposed action by the U.S. Board and was able to prevent it. At first, the Board consideration was delayed by opposition from Secretary of the Interior Rogers Morton, under whose purview the board fell, as he personally did not favor a change of the mountain's name. Later, in 1977, with Secretary Morton no longer at the helm of the Department of the Interior, the Board again prepared to consider the name change, but Regula gathered signatures from every member of the Ohio congressional delegation against renaming Mount McKinley, and no ruling was made.

On December 2, 1980, with President Jimmy Carter's signing into law of the Alaska National Interest Lands Conservation Act (ANILCA), McKinley National Park—which had been created on February 26, 1917—was incorporated into a larger protected area named Denali National Park and Preserve. Naming the new, larger park Denali, while retaining the name Mount McKinley for the actual mountain was thought to be a compromise by many "Mount McKinley" partisans. However, "Denali" advocates, including Alaska Congressman Don Young, rejected the position that the 1980 action constituted a real compromise, and instead argued that naming the mountain and park differently only created confusion. While the Board was originally set to make a ruling on December 10, 1980, with the passage of Lands Conservation Act on December 2, they opted to defer their ruling yet again.

The following year, Regula used a procedural maneuver to prevent any change to the Mount McKinley name. Under U.S. Board on Geographic Names policy, the Board cannot consider any name-change proposal if congressional legislation relating to that name is pending. Thus, Regula began a biennial legislative tradition of either introducing language into Interior Department appropriation bills, or introducing a stand-alone bill that directed that the name of Mount McKinley should not be changed. This effectively killed the Denali name-change proposal pending with the Board.

== Renewed efforts to change official federal name – 2009 to 2015 ==
In 2009, the retirement of Regula reinvigorated interest in changing the mountain's federal name. Alaska State Representative Scott Kawasaki sponsored Alaska House Joint Resolution 15, which urges the U.S. Congress to rename the mountain Denali. Despite efforts in Alaska, Ohio Representatives Betty Sutton and Tim Ryan assumed Regula's role as congressional guardians of the Mount McKinley name and introduced H.R. 229 which reads: "Notwithstanding any other authority of law, the mountain located 63 degrees 04 minutes 12 seconds north, by 151 degrees 00 minutes 18 seconds west shall continue to be named and referred to for all purposes as Mount McKinley."

A January 2015 bill submitted by Alaska Senator Lisa Murkowski once again proposed renaming the peak to Denali. In a June 2015 testimony to Congress, the National Park Service's associate director stated that the NPS "has no objection to adopting the name of Denali for Mt. McKinley".

== 2015: Official federal name changed to Denali ==
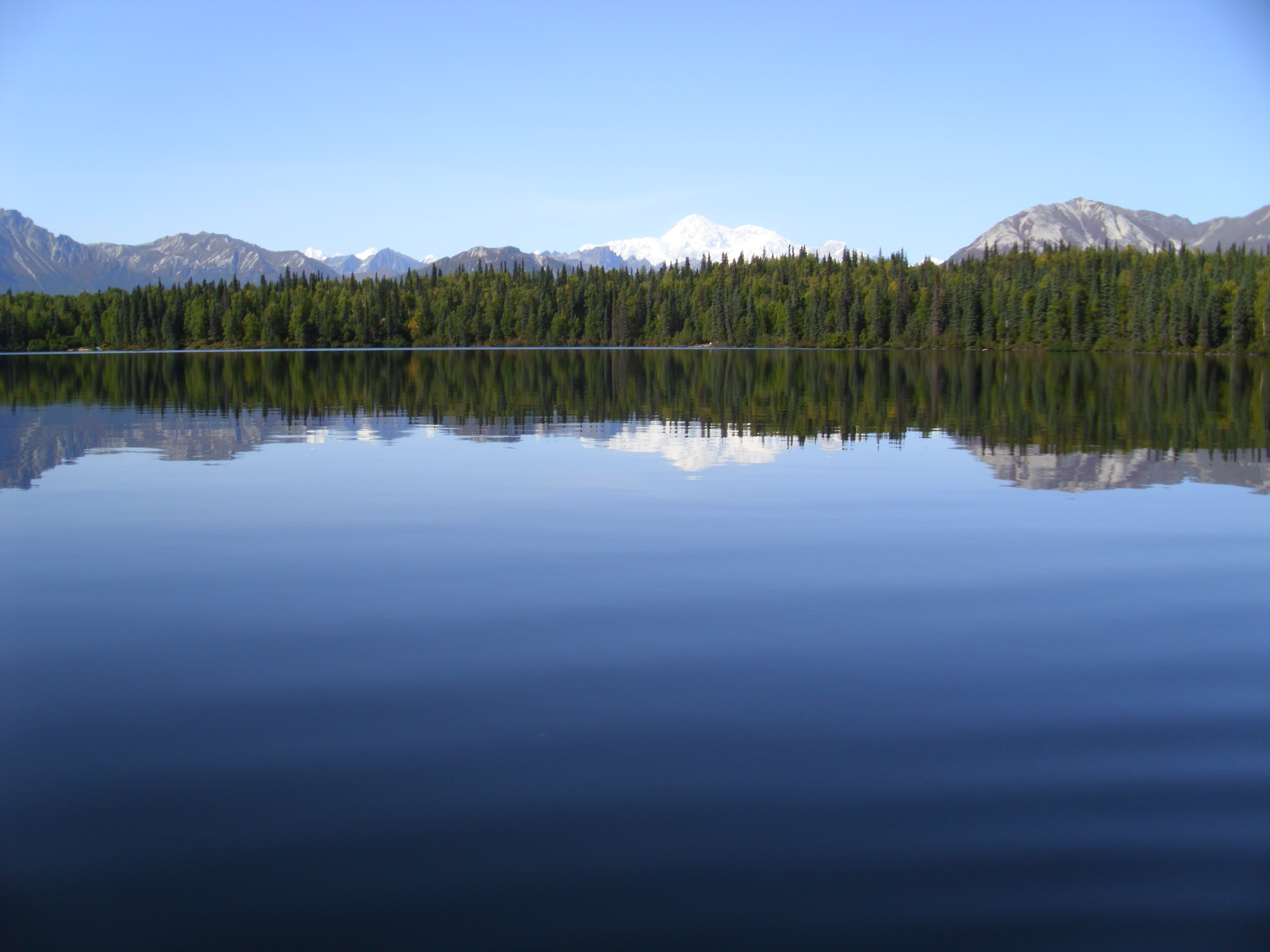
Denali seen from Byers Lake the morning after the rename

On August 28, 2015, Sally Jewell renamed the mountain Denali, under authority of federal law which permits her, as Secretary of the Interior, to name geographic features if the Board on Geographic Names does not act within a "reasonable" period of time. In media interviews, Jewell cited the board's failure to act on the state's four-decade-old request, saying, "I think any of us would think that 40 years is an unreasonable amount of time."

=== Reactions to name change ===
Ohio Republicans were critical of the renaming. John Boehner, a Representative from Ohio who served as Speaker of the United States House of Representatives at the time of the name change, said he was "deeply disappointed" by the change, while Regula, who had retired by the time of the name change, commented that Obama "thinks he is a dictator". Presidential candidate Donald Trump called the name change a "great insult to Ohio" and vowed to reverse the decision if elected. All 13 Republican members of Ohio's congressional delegation signed a letter of complaint denouncing the "troubling" action of the Obama administration: "William McKinley's legacy has been tarnished by a political stunt." U.S. Representative Mike Turner of Ohio vowed to fight the change: "I'm certain [Obama] didn't notify President McKinley's descendants, who find this outrageous." Not all the state's elected Republicans agreed, however, such as Ohio Secretary of State Jon A. Husted:

I wouldn't want people from Alaska telling me what things in Ohio should be. So I guess we shouldn't tell people from Alaska what they should do in their own state.

In February 2015, in response to the objections from Ohio, Senator Lisa Murkowski of Alaska, a Republican, said:

There's a lot of things in Ohio that are already named after McKinley. This is no affront to our former president; this is all about ensuring that respect for the land and respect for the native people of the region is afforded.

Ohio native and junior Alaska Senator Dan Sullivan, a Republican, said he was "gratified" that President Obama changed the name. Alaska Governor Bill Walker, an independent, said: "Alaska's place names should reflect and respect the rich cultural history of our state, and officially recognizing the name Denali does just that."

On August 30, 2015, speaking from Denali's Ruth Glacier, Senator Murkowski said:

For centuries, Alaskans have known this majestic mountain as the 'Great One'. Today we are honored to be able to officially recognize the mountain as Denali. I'd like to thank the President for working with us to achieve this significant change to show honor, respect and gratitude to the Athabascan people of Alaska.

During a "climate change-focused" visit in the first week of September 2015, Obama restated the renaming of the mountain. On September 6, 2015, former Alaska Governor Sarah Palin criticized Obama's Alaskan visit and also voiced her opposition to the name change: "The name of the national park was changed to Denali some years ago. So I thought that was good enough. We could keep McKinley as the highest peak on the North American continent. We could keep that name McKinley."

After the 2016 presidential election, President Trump and Interior Secretary Ryan Zinke asked Alaskan senators Dan Sullivan and Lisa Murkowski whether they wanted Trump to reverse the name change. The two senators told Trump that they did not want this, and Trump agreed not to reverse the name change.

== 2025: Official federal name changed back to Mount McKinley ==
After winning reelection in 2024, President Donald Trump said to supporters in a speech at the AmericaFest convention which was hosted by Turning Point USA:

McKinley was a very good, maybe a great president. They took his name off Mount McKinley. That's what they do to people. President McKinley was the president that was responsible for creating a vast sum of money. That's one of the reasons that we're going to bring back the name of Mount McKinley, because I think he deserves it.

On January 20, 2025, on his first day back in office, Trump signed an executive order requiring the Obama-era name change to be reverted by the Secretary of the Interior within 30 days of signing. The order includes having members appointed to the Board on Geographic Names to aid in the order's fulfillment. On January 23, 2025, the Department of the Interior changed the mountain's official federal name back to Mount McKinley. The same day, the Associated Press reverted to using Mount McKinley instead of Denali, reasoning that as president, Trump has the authority to change federal geographical names of features lying within national borders. The order marked a return to the Alaskan and federal governments using different names for the mountain.

Both U.S. senators from Alaska, Republicans Lisa Murkowski and Dan Sullivan, along with Alaska State Senator Scott Kawasaki, a Democrat, strongly opposed Trump's decision. Murkowski wrote: "There is only one name worthy of North America's tallest mountain: Denali — the Great One".

On February 13, 2025, Murkowski introduced a bill, co-sponsored by Sullivan, to officially restore the name Denali to the federal government. Three Democratic senators have also signed on as sponsors.

== See also ==
- Derry/Londonderry name dispute, British naming dispute with political background
- Dual naming
- Gulf of Mexico naming controversy, resulting from Trump's executive order
- Lake Ontario naming dispute
