= Gulf of Mexico naming controversy =

US geographic naming controversy since 2025

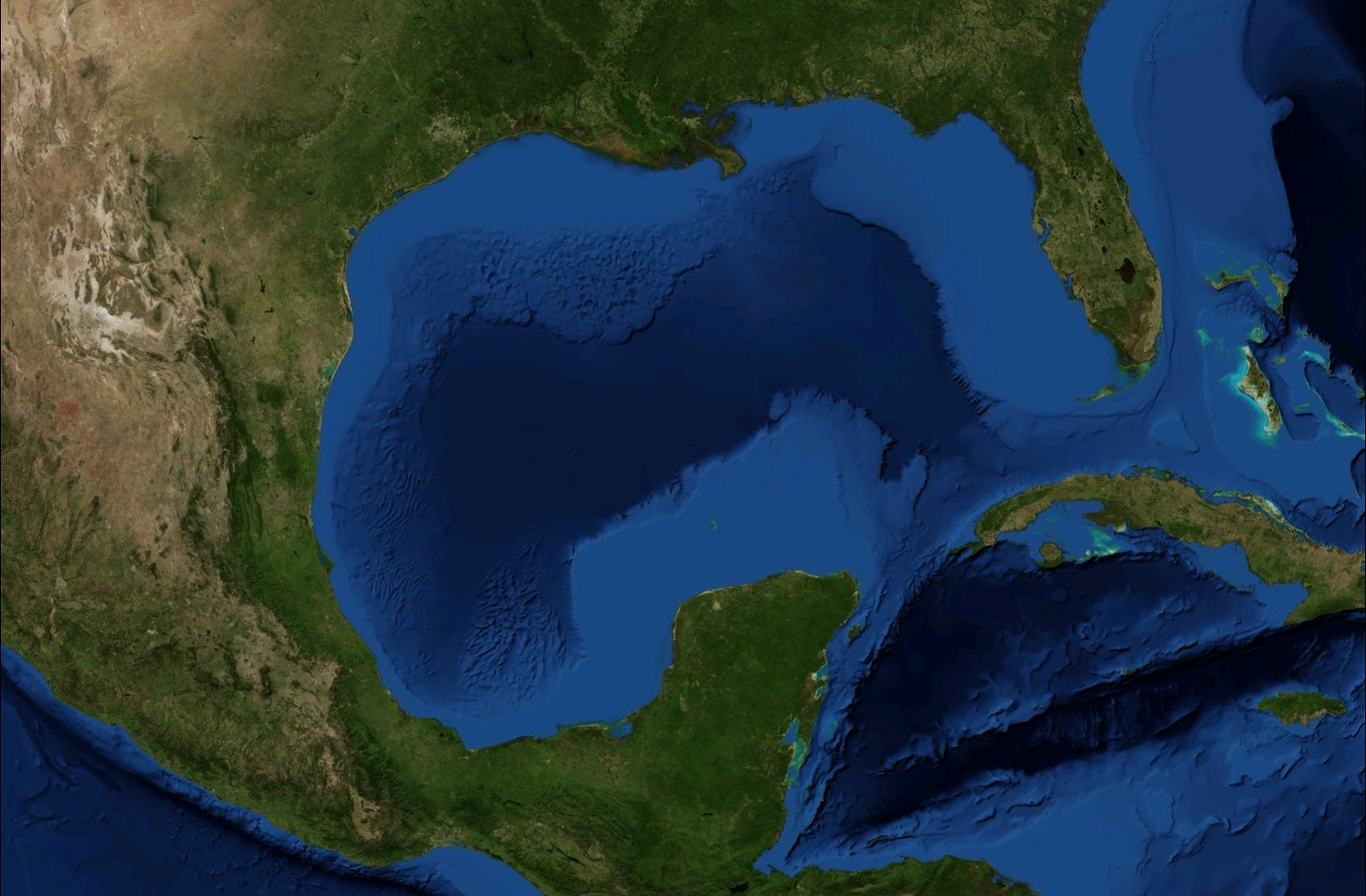
Aerial view of the gulf

The Gulf of Mexico became the center of a geographical naming dispute in the United States when U.S. president Donald Trump issued Executive Order 14172 directing U.S. federal agencies to refer to it as the "Gulf of America". Issued on the day of his second inauguration (January 20, 2025), the executive order only requires the U.S. executive branch to use this nomenclature. However, no Act of Congress has been enacted to change the name and federal laws still name the gulf as the Gulf of Mexico, although major online map platforms and some U.S.-based media outlets have voluntarily made the change. A February 2025 poll by Marquette University found that, among 1,018 respondents across the U.S., 71% opposed renaming the Gulf of Mexico and 29% supported the name change.

The name "Gulf of Mexico" has been in use since the 1550s, derived from Mexica, the Nahuatl term for the Aztecs. The name soon became internationally recognized, and remains in use by bodies such as the International Hydrographic Organization.

== Background ==
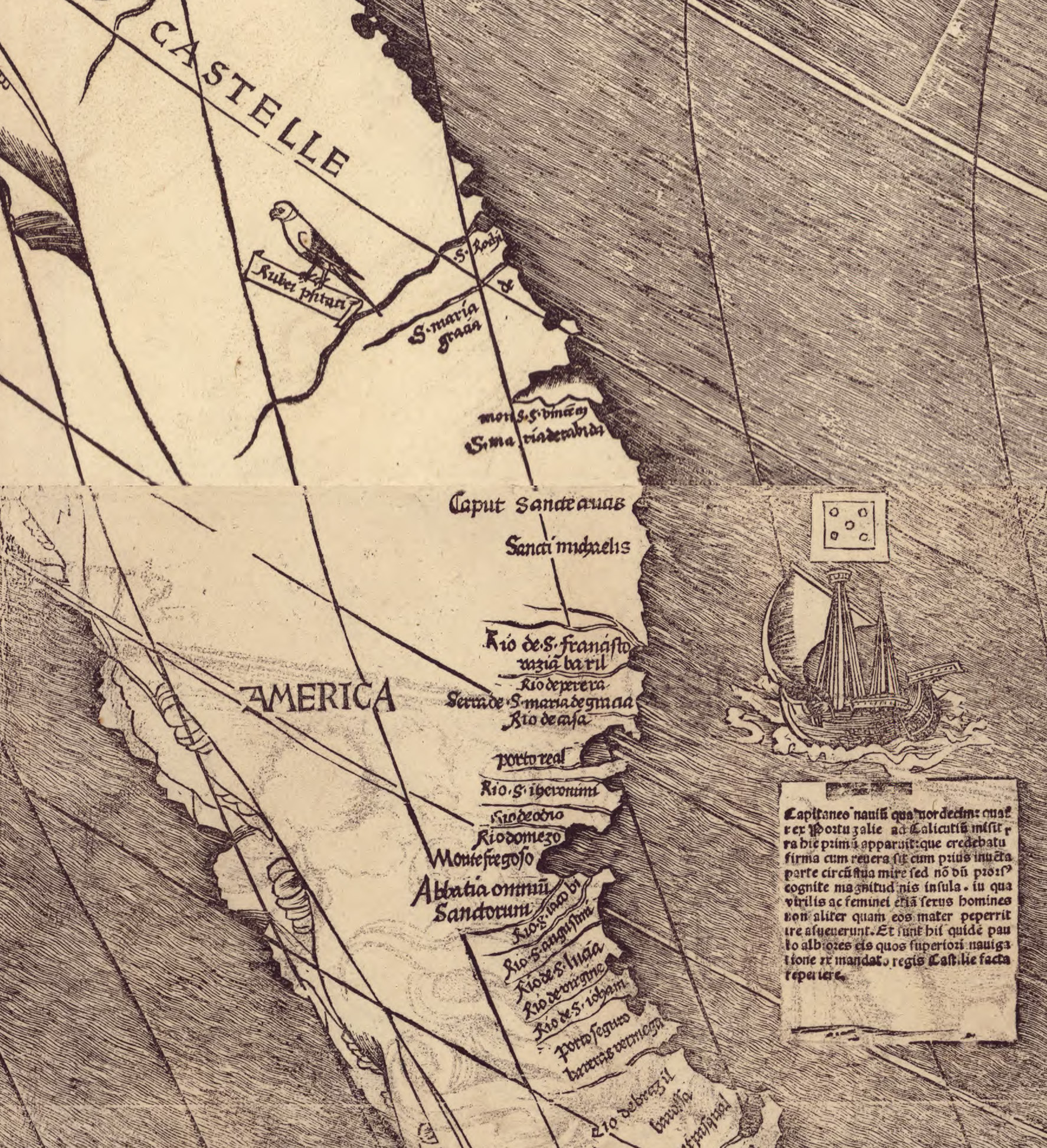
Detail of the Universalis Cosmographia (1507) by Martin Waldseemüller, showing the name "America", specifically referring to what is now known as South America. Later, in 1538, Gerardus Mercator expanded the use of the term America to designate the entire continent in his maps.

Amerigo Vespucci, along with other explorers, is credited with the first European exploration of the Gulf of Mexico and the Yucatán Channel, between 1497 and 1498. He navigated the Straits of Florida, and continued northward up to Chesapeake Bay before returning to Spain. It has been disputed, however, that the voyage actually took place.

For centuries, the Gulf of Mexico has been recognized by that name—derived from the term Mexica (the Nahuatl name for the Aztecs). It began to be used on early European maps in 1550, and the name has since become established in international cartography and legal usage by bodies such as the International Hydrographic Organization.

The United States Geological Survey (USGS) received a proposal to rename the Gulf of Mexico to the Gulf of America in 2006, and the Board on Geographic Names (BGN) unanimously decided not to approve it. Renaming the waters was the humorous premise of a 2010 piece by American comedian Stephen Colbert, who proposed creation of a "Gulf of America fund" to pay for the cleanup necessary following the Deepwater Horizon oil spill, stating: "I don't think we can call it the Gulf of Mexico anymore. We broke it, we bought it."

Steve Holland, a Democratic state representative from Mississippi, jokingly introduced a 2012 bill proposing the name change. In a radio interview at the time, he explained that the Mississippi GOP appeared dedicated to pushing anything Mexican out of the state, so renaming the gulf would help with that cause. "This new majority goes against a lot of the tenets of New Testament Christianity that I've based 29 years of legislation on," Holland told NPR. "They want to kick immigrants out of the state, they want to drug-test Medicaid people, they want to get rid of anything that's not 'America'. So I just thought it would be in keeping to introduce a bill to change the name of the Gulf of Mexico to the Gulf of America. It fits right in with what the majority thinking apparently is now."

A new bill was introduced to the U.S. House of Representatives on January 9, 2025. In a January 15–16, 2025, poll of U.S. registered voters, 72% opposed the renaming while 28% supported it. On May 8, 2025, the House narrowly approved the bill, but the Senate has not taken action.

== Presidential declaration ==
On January 20, 2025, President Trump signed Executive Order 14172 directing the interior secretary to adopt the name Gulf of America, specifying an area of the U.S. continental shelf "extending to the seaward boundary with Mexico and Cuba." The U.S. Interior Department confirmed that U.S. federal agencies would use the name Gulf of America from January 24, 2025. As an executive order, this does not compel the use of the new name by non-federal agencies, private companies, or foreign entities. Trump declared February 9, 2025, to be "Gulf of America Day".

== Reactions to declaration ==
=== In the United States ===
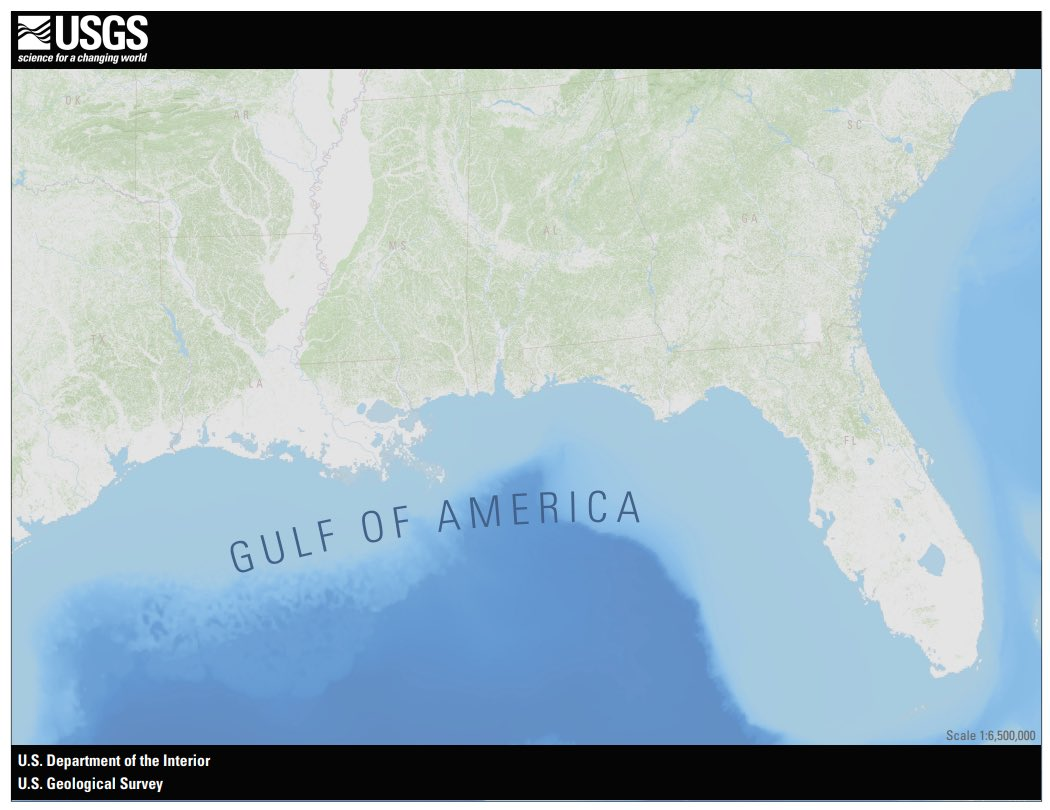
U.S. Geological Survey map, February 2025

Reactions among U.S. political figures and agencies have been mixed. Proponents of the renaming argue that it reinforces an "America First" agenda and reflects a renewed emphasis on national heritage. Several state officials from Gulf Coast states have at times supported the change in official documents.

A February 2025 poll by Marquette University found that, among 1,018 respondents nationwide, 71% opposed renaming the Gulf of Mexico and 29% supported the name change. In a February 2025 poll of 871 registered voters in Florida who were active by the University of North Florida found that 58% of overall respondents opposed renaming the Gulf of Mexico to the Gulf of America, 31% supported it, 10% said they were not sure and 1% refused to answer the question.

Since February 10, 2025, following an official update by the U.S. Geographic Names Information System (GNIS) developed by the United States Geological Survey, Google Maps and Google Earth have varied the name displayed for the gulf based on device location settings, with Google stating that users in the U.S. see "Gulf of America", users in Mexico see "Gulf of Mexico", and users elsewhere see both names. Apple Maps and Bing Maps have also updated their U.S. labeling of the Gulf of Mexico to "Gulf of America" in line with the same official update. MapQuest refused to alter the name, joking that they had lost the ability to update their information when owned by AOL in the 2000s. They also said that they follow the naming conventions from GNIS. Since February 18, 2025, the GNIS has shown the name of the gulf as "Gulf of America".

Various bodies and media outlets reacted to the federal action, with most saying that common usage for the gulf would prevail. Among prominent media outlets, Axios and Fox News adopted the change, with USA Today using both names in tandem. On February 11, the White House chose not to invite an Associated Press (AP) reporter to an event in the Oval Office over the AP's decision to continue using "Gulf of Mexico", which the AP executive editor Julie Pace condemned as a violation of its First Amendment rights.

White House press secretary Karoline Leavitt defended the decision of the White House, saying:

If we feel there are lies being pushed by outlets in this room, we are going to hold those lies accountable ... And it is a fact that the body of water off the coast of Louisiana is called the Gulf of America, and I'm not sure why news outlets don't want to call it that but that is what it is.

On February 14, the White House deputy chief of staff, Taylor Budowich, announced that AP journalists were banned indefinitely from the Oval Office and Air Force One for their decision to continue using "Gulf of Mexico", with Budowich accusing the AP of "commitment to misinformation" and "irresponsible and dishonest reporting". The White House Correspondents' Association responded that the White House has "publicly admitted they are restricting access to events to punish a news outlet for not advancing the government's preferred language", and argued that this violated President Trump's "executive order on freedom of speech and ending federal censorship". On February 18, Trump said that the AP would continue to be barred "until such time as they agree that it's the Gulf of America". The AP sued in the case Associated Press v. Budowich, and on April 8, a federal judge issued a preliminary injunction that would take effect on April 13 requiring the White House to reinstate AP access. Following the decision, the White House released a statement asserting that "the ability to pose questions to the President of the United States in the Oval Office and aboard Air Force One constitutes a privilege extended to journalists, rather than a legally enshrined right."

On June 16, the Trump Organization announced the launch of a telecommunications company called Trump Mobile. Later that day, the firm removed its cellular coverage map "after sharp-eyed users noticed" that the Gulf of Mexico was shown with that name rather than with Trump's preferred name.

An analysis in October 2025 found that the "Gulf of Mexico" name generally predominated over "Gulf of America" in news sources, with the ratio mostly shifting further in favor of "Gulf of Mexico" over time.

=== International response ===
Mexican president Claudia Sheinbaum sarcastically countered President Trump by proposing to rename North America:

Obviously the Gulf of Mexico is recognized by the United Nations... but why don't we call [North America] "Mexican America"? We're going to call it Mexican America....It sounds pretty, no? Isn't it true?

After Google Maps revised the gulf's display name, Sheinbaum sued Google, reiterating that United States sovereignty is limited to 12 nautical miles from the coast.

The United Kingdom declined to recognize any different name for the Gulf of Mexico, based on common usage across the English-speaking world.

The Chinese Ministry of Foreign Affairs opposed the renaming, asserting that China opposes "hegemonic, domineering, and bullying practices in international relations".

== Legacy ==
Political commentator David Frum describes President Trump's renaming of the gulf as an attempt to project U.S. power, contrasting it with the historical European practice of mariners naming seas after destinations in less powerful countries on the opposite side, thus critiquing the action as a marker of decline. Jeffrey Abramson and Jack E. Davis, a noted author about the gulf's history, draw a parallel between the attempt to pressure the Associated Press and renamings by 20th century fascist leaders, warning of a possible precursor to scapegoating of minorities. Military historian Michael W. Charney describes the replacement of an indigenous reference with a European-derived name as an example of settler colonialism and compares the move to China's unilateral actions with respect to territorial disputes in the South China Sea. International security researcher Dalbir Ahlawat argues that the U.S. has emboldened China to pursue a more aggressive posture in the South China Sea, undermining the Biden administration's strategic partnerships with the Philippines, Indonesia, and Vietnam.

On August 27, 2026, amid an escalating trade war with Canada, Trump signed Executive Order 14422 to rename Lake Ontario, which separates the two countries, to "Lake America" in federal agency usage. The order received widespread backlash from both U.S. and Canadian government officials. Within days of the order, Google and Apple Maps renamed the lake for users located in the U.S.

== See also ==
- American expansionism under Donald Trump
- Denali–Mount McKinley naming dispute
- Lake Ontario naming dispute
- Dual naming
- Freedom fries
- List of geographical naming disputes
- Propaganda map
- United Nations Group of Experts on Geographical Names
