= 2025 in animation =

2025 in animation is an overview of notable events, including notable awards, list of films released, television show debuts and endings, and notable deaths.

== Events ==
=== January ===
- January 1:
  - Several Cartoon Network shows, including Ed, Edd n Eddy, The Grim Adventures of Billy & Mandy, Teen Titans, seasons 1-7 of Teen Titans Go!, Green Lantern: The Animated Series, The Looney Tunes Show, and Static Shock were removed from Max.
  - Family Guy reruns returned to Adult Swim after a three-year hiatus.
  - Popeye the Sailor, Tintin, and the first Silly Symphony short film, The Skeleton Dance, enter the public domain in the United States.
  - The season 18 finale episode of Upin & Ipin premiered on Astro Prima and MNCTV.
- January 3: Wallace & Gromit: Vengeance Most Fowl premiered internationally on Netflix.
- January 5: Zenshu premiered on TV Tokyo in Japan and was released globally on Crunchyroll, to generally positive reviews from critics and audiences as a freshly entertaining anime series of 2025 for its clever, farcical combination of industry satire and classic fantasy tropes. (Note: Attributed to multiple sources:)
- January 11: StuGo premiered on Disney Channel.
- January 12: Smile shuts down.
- January 17: RoboGobo premiered on Disney Jr.
- January 18: Season 3 of Chibiverse premiered on Disney Channel.
- January 20: Wonderblocks premiered on CBeebies.
- January 25: The final episode of Craig of the Creek, titled "See You Tomorrow at the Creek", premiered on Cartoon Network.
- January 28: The season 4 finale episode of Grizzy & the Lemmings premiered on France 4, Cartoon Network UK, Boomerang UK, Netflix and CBBC.
- January 29:
  - Your Friendly Neighborhood Spider-Man premiered on Disney+.
  - Ne Zha 2 was released in theaters in China, receiving critical acclaim and breaking multiple box-office records inside and outside of China. It became the highest-grossing animated film of all time.
- January 30: Mermicorno: Starfall was released as a Max exclusive.
- January 31: DreamWorks Animation's Dog Man was released.

=== February ===
- February 1: We Baby Bears resumed its second season on Cartoon Network.
- February 2: Common Side Effects premiered on Adult Swim.
- February 6:
  - Season 2 of Moon Girl and Devil Dinosaur resumed on Disney Channel.
  - The ninth and final season of Blaze and the Monster Machines premiered on Nickelodeon.
  - The third season of Invincible premiered on Prime Video.
- February 7: The French animated series, Belfort & Lupin released on Okoo.
- February 8: 52nd Annie Awards were held.
- February 13: The revival series of Mr. Bean: The Animated Series premiered on the Cartoon Network Asian feed.
- February 14:
  - The second part of the first season of Bea's Block premiered on Max.
  - The second and final season of Kamp Koral: SpongeBob's Under Years aired on Nickelodeon after premiering on Paramount+ the previous year.
- February 16: The second season of Grimsburg premiered on Fox.
- February 17: The eleventh season of Gabby's Dollhouse premiered on Netflix.
- February 19: Win or Lose premiered on Disney+.

=== March ===
- March 1:
  - Doraemon: Nobita's Earth Symphony, the 43rd film of the Doraemon film series, was broadcast on TV Asahi.
  - The ninth season of Teen Titans Go! premiered on Cartoon Network.
- March 2: 97th Academy Awards:
  - Flow directed by Gints Zilbalodis wins Best Animated Feature.
  - In the Shadow of the Cypress directed by Hossein Molayemi and Shirin Sohani wins Best Animated Short Film.
- March 3:
  - Skillsville premiered on PBS Kids.
  - It was reported that a planned Disney+ spin-off series for the Disney animated feature The Princess and the Frog, titled Tiana for its protagonist, voiced by Anika Noni Rose, was canceled as part of Walt Disney Animation Studios abandoning long-form content, to be replaced with a separate short-form special. The series had originally been announced in 2020 alongside a planned series spin-off of Moana, itself ultimately retooled into a film sequel.
- March 4: The nineteenth season of Upin & Ipin, premiered on Astro Prima and MNCTV.
- March 6:
  - Universal Kids shuts down.
  - The Jellystone! crossover special, "Crisis on Infinite Mirths", premiered on Max.
- March 7:
  - Doraemon: Nobita's Art World Tales, the 44th film in the Doraemon franchise, was released in Japanese cinemas by Toho. This film is a special work for the 45th anniversary of the Doraemon film series.
  - Plankton: The Movie premiered on Netflix in the United States.
  - Night of the Zoopocalypse was released in United States and Canada.
- March 8: The final two episodes of Moon Girl and Devil Dinosaur premiered on Disney Channel.
- March 9: Oh My God... Yes! premiered on Adult Swim.
- March 14: The Day the Earth Blew Up: A Looney Tunes Movie was released.
- March 15: The second season of Kiff premiered on Disney Channel.
- March 16: The Family Guy episode "The Chicken or the Meg" premieres on Fox, this episode marks the official death of Peter Griffin's arch-nemesis Ernie the Giant Chicken, who was killed by Meg.
- March 17: The original Looney Tunes cartoons are removed from Max as part of a new plan to focus more on adult and family programming, with children's programming no longer being a priority to the streaming service due to low viewership.
- March 20: Wolf King premiered on Netflix.
- March 21: The fourth season of The Patrick Star Show premiered on Nickelodeon.
- March 22: The final episodes of Tiny Toons Looniversity premiered on Max.
- March 23: Season 6 of Miraculous: Tales of Ladybug & Cat Noir premiered on TF1 in France.
- March 24: The American Dad! 21st season finale, titled "What Great Advancements!", premiered on TBS. This was the final episode to premiere on the network as the show will return to Fox the following year for its 26th season.
- March 31: Ketchup Entertainment, the distributor of The Day the Earth Blew Up: A Looney Tunes Movie, acquires the distribution of Coyote vs. Acme.

=== April ===
- April 3: Television series adaptation Devil May Cry, based on the Capcom video game franchise of the same name, was released as a Netflix exclusive.
- April 5:
  - Season 2 of Wind Breaker premiered on Japanese television.
  - Iyanu premiered on Cartoon Network and the next day on Max.
- April 6:
  - Witch Watch premiered on Japanese television and debuted globally on Crunchyroll, Netflix, and Hulu, earning generally positive reviews from critics and audiences as a freshly entertaining anime comedy of 2025 for its whimsical magical hijinks and charming character chemistry.
  - Umamusume: Cinderella Gray premiered on Japanese television and was released globally across streaming platforms like Netflix and Amazon Prime Video, earning widespread acclaim for its exceptional animation quality, gripping writing, and a deeply resonant underdog story that redefined the franchise's sports drama format.
- April 11: Angel Studios' The King of Kings was released.
- April 13: The series finale of Hamster & Gretel premiered on Disney Channel.
- April 16: Episodes 13–19 from Season 4 of Big City Greens were released on Disney+ (with episodes 18 and 19 being released before premiering on Disney Channel and Disney XD).
- April 18: The first/pilot episode of The Gaslight District was released on YouTube on the GLITCH channel.
- April 19: Super Duper Bunny League premiered on Nickelodeon.
- April 25:
  - The second season of Skydance Animation's WondLa premiered on Apple TV+.
  - Hazbin Hotel's sister series Helluva Boss was announced to move to Prime Video starting this fall, the first two seasons were released on the streaming service while the third and fourth seasons will premiere on there before YouTube.
- April 26: The third-season finale of Chibiverse premiered on Disney Channel.
- April 27: The series finale of Primos premiered on Disney Channel.
- April 30: Asterix & Obelix: The Big Fight premiered on Netflix.

=== May ===
- May 1: The revival series of Mr. Bean: The Animated Series premiered on Boomerang UK and ITVX.
- May 3:
  - The 100th episode of Big City Greens, titled "One Hundred", premiered on Disney Channel.
  - StuGo aired its final episode on Disney Channel.
- May 4: Season 3 of Star Wars: Tales premiered on Disney+.
- May 7: The final 12 episodes of Hamster & Gretel were released on Disney+.
- May 8: The final season of Blood of Zeus premiered on Netflix.
- May 10: Paw Patrol concludes its 11th season on TVO in Canada with the episodes "Pups Save the Space Kitty/Pups Save the Sea Sponges".
- May 16: Murder Drones was acquired and re-released on Prime Video.
- May 18: The Simpsons thirty-sixth-season finale, titled "Estranger Things", premiered on Fox. The episode guest stars Max Greenfield, Sarah McLachlan, and returning actress Zooey Deschanel.
- May 19:
  - The teaser trailer for the revival/spin-off series of The Amazing World of Gumball, The Wonderfully Weird World of Gumball, was released on YouTube.
  - Netflix acquires the rights to Sesame Street after the show's deal with HBO Max and Warner Bros. Discovery expired.
- May 23:
  - Walt Disney Pictures' live-action/animated remake of Lilo & Stitch was released.
  - The eighth and final season of Big Mouth premiered on Netflix.
- May 25: The eighth season of Rick and Morty premiered on Adult Swim.

=== June ===
- June 5: The fifth/revival season of Phineas and Ferb premiered on Disney Channel and the first ten episodes were released the next day on Disney+.
- June 6
  - 20th Century's Predator: Killer of Killers premiered on Hulu.
  - Wylde Pak premiered on Nickelodeon.
- June 7: The Big City Greens half-hour special "Chip's Revenge" premiered on Disney Channel.
- June 9: Season 5 of The Creature Cases was released on Netflix.
- June 13: DreamWorks Animation's live-action/animated remake of How to Train Your Dragon was released. It was the first live-action/animated DreamWorks Animation film.
- June 16: The fourth season of Spidey and His Amazing Friends premiered on Disney Jr.
- June 20:
  - Pixar's Elio was released and features a bloopers/outtakes reel that was previously featured on A Bug's Life, Toy Story 2, Monsters, Inc., and The Incredibles.
  - Sony Pictures Animation's KPop Demon Hunters premiered on Netflix to overwhelming acclaim by both critics and audiences.
  - The untitled fifth episode of The Amazing Digital Circus was released on YouTube on the GLITCH channel. For unknown reasons, the episode did not have a simultaneous release on Netflix alongside YouTube.
  - The season 15 finale of SpongeBob SquarePants premiered on Nickelodeon.
- June 24: It was announced that The Tiny Chef Show had been cancelled by Nickelodeon by uploading a video featuring Tiny Chef getting a call from Nickelodeon where he learns of the show's cancellation and begins to cry, which became a viral video on social media platforms. The creators later launched a crowdfunding site to revive the show through social media platforms.
- June 27:
  - Adult Swim's Checkered Past block shuts down in the United States.
  - The 16th season of SpongeBob SquarePants premiered on Nickelodeon with the hour-long special "SpongeBob and Patrick's Timeline Twist-Up".
- June 28: The fifth Helluva Boss short, titled "Mission: Orphan Time", was released on YouTube.
  - Takopi's Original Sin was released on Netflix, Crunchyroll, and other streaming platforms, where it was acclaimed by critics and audiences as one of the best anime series of 2025 for its harrowing, terrifying subversion of cute aesthetics into severe psychological trauma and domestic horror. (Note: Attributed to multiple sources:)

=== July ===
- July 3: The first episode of Milky Subway: The Galactic Limited Express was released on YouTube.
- July 6:
  - The Summer Hikaru Died premiered on Nippon TV in Japan and was released globally on Netflix, receiving highly positive responses from critics and audiences as one of the best anime series of 2025 for its chilling "uncanny valley" visual aesthetic and the compelling emotional depth of its main characters' relationship. (Note: Attributed to multiple sources:)
  - Gachiakuta premiered on Japan's TBS and was released globally across Crunchyroll and other major streaming platforms, where it received mostly positive responses from critics and audiences as one of the best anime series of 2025 for its fluidly dynamic action choreography and its unique, vibrant street-art and graffiti-inspired aesthetic. (Note: Attributed to multiple sources:)
  - The Fragrant Flower Blooms with Dignity premiered on Japan's Tokyo MX and was released globally on Netflix, earning widespread acclaim from critics and audiences as one of the best and freshest anime series of 2025 for its emotionally mature writing, vibrant art style, heartfelt voice performances, and sincere portrayal of a romance overcoming deep-seated social prejudices. (Note: Attributed to multiple sources:)
- July 7: KyoAni's City the Animation premiered on Japan's Tokyo MX and debuted internationally on Amazon Prime Video, earning mostly positive responses from critics and audiences as one of the best and freshest anime comedies of 2025 for its high-energy, absurdist slapstick humour and incredibly vibrant visual style. (Note: Attributed to multiple sources:)
- July 10: The anime series adaptation of Scott Westerfeld's Leviathan premiered as a Netflix exclusive.
- July 17: The 23rd season finale of Family Guy, titled "Twain's World", premiered on Fox.
- July 18:
  - Paramount Animation's Smurfs was released.
  - Demon Slayer: Kimetsu no Yaiba – The Movie: Infinity Castle was released in Japanese cinemas by Aniplex and Toho to critical acclaim and breaking multiple box-office records as the highest-grossing Japanese film of all time.
  - Glitch Productions announces that The Gaslight District is officially greenlit for a full series.
  - Season 12 of Paw Patrol begins on Nickelodeon in the US with the premiere of the episodes "Pups Save a Pop Star/Pups Save the Meditation Dome".
- July 21: Mickey Mouse Clubhouse+ premiered on Disney Jr. and the next day on Disney+.
- July 23:
  - The season 27 premiere of South Park, titled "Sermon on the 'Mount", premiered on Comedy Central. The season was originally scheduled to premiere on July 9, but it was delayed.
  - Season 2 of Kiff was released on Disney+ after premiering on Disney Channel on March 15, with three new episodes released before premiering on Disney Channel and Disney XD.
- July 24:
  - My Melody & Kuromi premiered on Netflix.
  - Waldemar Fast's Grand Prix of Europe was released in German theaters.
  - A sequel to The Dragon Prince Netflix series, titled The Dragon King, was announced to be in early development. To independently fund and find a distributor for the series, a crowdfunding campaign is set to be launched on the Kickstarter platform.
- July 25: The Loud House eighth-season finale premiered on Nickelodeon with the final parts in the Europe Road Trip arc "A Bite in Transylvania/Greece Is the Word".
- July 28: The Amazing World of Gumball returned with a new revival/spin-off series (previously referred to as a seventh season), titled The Wonderfully Weird World of Gumball. It premiered as a Hulu exclusive in the United States.
- July 30:
  - StuGo was released on Disney+ after premiering on Disney Channel on January 11.
  - The final ten episodes from the fourth season of Big City Greens were released on Disney+, with two new episodes released before premiering on Disney Channel and Disney XD.

=== August ===
- August 1:
  - DreamWorks Animation's The Bad Guys 2 was released.
  - Eyes of Wakanda premiered on Disney+.
  - Season 9 of The Loud House premiered on Nickelodeon.
- August 2:
  - The sixth Helluva Boss short, titled "Mission: Bad Drivezo", was released on YouTube.
  - Season 12 of Paw Patrol begins on TVO in Canada with the premiere of the episodes "Pups Save a Pop Star/Pups Save the Meditation Dome".
- August 4: Season 14 of King of the Hill premiered on Hulu, after a 16-year hiatus from its original run.
- August 6: Season 3 of The Proud Family: Louder and Prouder premiered on Disney+.
- August 9: The fourth season finale of Big City Greens premiered on Disney Channel and Disney XD.
- August 13:
  - Sony Pictures Animation's Fixed premiered as a Netflix exclusive.
  - The second and final season of Sausage Party: Foodtopia premiered on Prime Video.
- August 14: The Bob's Burgers 15th season finale, titled "Insomnibob", premiered on Fox.
- August 15:
  - Paw Patrol concludes its 11th season on Nickelodeon in the US with the episodes "Fire Rescue: Pups Save the Flaming Flounder/Fire Rescue: Pups Makes the News".
  - The sixth episode of The Amazing Digital Circus, titled "They All Get Guns", was released on YouTube on the GLITCH channel.
- August 21: It was announced that Noggin would relaunch its steaming service as an independent pre-teen oriented service.
- August 22: Long Story Short premiered on Netflix.
- August 29: Canadian animation studio Nelvana is reported to be closing.

=== September ===
- September 1: The second and third seasons of The Loud House are on Netflix for the first time.
- September 3: The eleventh season of Beavis and Butt-Head premiered on Comedy Central.
- September 5: Salvation Poem Project's Light of the World was released.
- September 6:
  - The seventh Helluva Boss short, titled "Mission: Whacked Off", was released on YouTube.
  - At the 77th Primetime Creative Arts Emmy Awards, Arcane and Love, Death & Robots win four awards each.
- September 8:
  - Weather Hunters premiered on PBS Kids.
  - Dr. Seuss's Red Fish, Blue Fish premiered on Netflix.
  - Greg Cipes was announced to have been fired by Warner Bros. as the voice of Beast Boy, but will still able to voice characters in Teen Titans Go!.
- September 10: The first two seasons of the independent animated YouTube series Helluva Boss was released on Prime Video, alongside a new episode titled "Mission: Zero", which is a remake of the pilot. The episode would be released on YouTube on October 25.
- September 11:
  - The second and final season of Wolf King premiered on Netflix.
  - Comedy Central temporarily pulls the South Park episode "Got a Nut" from airings following the assassination of Charlie Kirk the previous day (Kirk was parodied in the episode, and reportedly enjoyed it).
- September 12: The teaser trailer to The Super Mario Galaxy Movie, the sequel to The Super Mario Bros. Movie, was released in honor of the 40th anniversary of the Super Mario Bros. game and the Super Mario series overall.
- September 15:
  - The third and final season of Firebuds premiered on Disney Jr..
  - The 10th season of Futurama was released on Hulu.
- September 18:
  - The series finale episode of Milky Subway: The Galactic Limited Express was released on YouTube.
  - Warner Bros. Animation's Aztec Batman: Clash of Empires was released.
- September 19:
  - Chainsaw Man – The Movie: Reze Arc was released in Japanese cinemas by Toho.
  - The pilot/first episode of Glitch Productions' first traditionally-animated series, Knights of Guinevere, was released on YouTube on the GLITCH channel.
- September 22: The third season of SuperKitties premiered on Disney Jr.
- September 24:
  - Marvel Zombies premiered on Disney+.
  - South Park season 27 finale premiered on Comedy Central.
- September 26:
  - The series finale of Kamp Koral: SpongeBob's Under Years premiered on Nickelodeon.
  - DreamWorks Animation's Gabby's Dollhouse: The Movie was released. It is the second live-action/animated DreamWorks Animation film.
- September 28:
  - Season 37 of The Simpsons premiered on Fox, with the episode "Thrifty Ways to Thieve Your Mother".
  - Season 16 of Bob's Burgers premiered on Fox, with the episode "Grand Pre-Pre-Opening".

=== October ===
- October 2:
  - Charlotte's Web was released as a HBO Max exclusive.
  - Winx Club: The Magic Is Back, a reboot of Iginio Straffi's Winx Club, was released as a Netflix exclusive.
- October 3:
  - The Sisters Grimm was released as an Apple TV exclusive.
  - Smiling Friends creators Michael Cusack and Zach Hadel, as well as producer, Aron Fromm, have announced their new Los Angeles-based studio called ZAM Studios, which will offer high quality animation, VFX, production and post-production, as well as specialize in client services for television, feature film and commercial projects, as well as creating original content.
- October 4: The eighth and final season of My Hero Academia premiered on Nippon TV.
- October 5:
  - The second season of the Ranma ½ series remake by MAPPA premiered on Japanese terrestrial television and was released on Netflix shortly after.
  - Season 3 of Smiling Friends premiered on Adult Swim.
- October 6:
  - Family Guy's second exclusive Halloween special for Hulu titled "A Little Fright Music" was released.
  - The Wonderfully Weird World of Gumball, the spin-off/revival series of The Amazing World of Gumball, premiered internationally on Cartoon Network and HBO Max.
  - Dr. Seuss's Horton! premiered on Netflix.
- October 10:
  - Netflix, Gobelins Paris and Guillermo del Toro launched a new stop-motion studio that will produce stop-motion films at the studio, while also serving as a school for storytellers.
  - The Lackadaisy pilot was announced to become a full animated-series, and will be co-produced by Glitch Productions.
- October 11: Scooby-Doo & Shaggy Rogers were added as skins to Fortnite.
- October 13: The final season of Solar Opposites premiered on Hulu.
- October 14: Splinter Cell: Deathwatch premiered on Netflix.
- October 15:
  - Benjamin Mousquet's Chickenhare and the Secret of the Groundhog was released in French theaters.
  - Season 28 of South Park premiered on Comedy Central.
- October 17: Netflix Animation Studios' The Twits premiered on Netflix.
- October 18: Fred Jones, Daphne Blake, & Velma Dinkley from Scooby-Doo are all added as skins to Fortnite.
- October 23: Season 2 of Adventure Time: Fionna and Cake was released on HBO Max.
- October 26: The SpongeBob Movie: Search for SquarePants initially premiered at the 2025 AFI Film Festival, it was released in theaters on December 19.
- October 29:
  - Season 2 of Hazbin Hotel premiered on Prime Video with the first two episodes. The remaining six episodes were released two episodes a week until November 19.
  - Season 3 of Star Wars: Visions premiered on Disney+.

=== November ===
- November 1–26: Various characters from The Simpsons getting added as skins & sidekicks to Fortnite.
- November 6: The Bad Guys: Breaking In, the prequel television series to The Bad Guys, premiered on Netflix.
- November 7:
  - Waldemar Fast's Grand Prix of Europe was released in the United States.
  - The second season of Rock Paper Scissors premiered on Nickelodeon.
  - The fourth season of Deer Squad was released on iQIYI.
- November 8: Dino Ranch: Island Explorers, a spin-off of the original Dino Ranch series, premieres
- November 10: The second season of Ariel premiered on Disney Jr. in the United States.
- November 14: Netflix Animation Studios' In Your Dreams premiered on Netflix.
- November 17: The twelfth season of Gabby's Dollhouse premiered on Netflix.
- November 19: The final two episodes from Season 2 of Hazbin Hotel were released on Prime Video.
- November 21: A Loud House Christmas Movie: Naughty or Nice premiered on Nickelodeon.
- November 22:
  - The series finale of BoBoiBoy Galaxy was released on YouTube.
  - Kiff concludes its second season on Disney Channel and Disney XD with the two-part episodes "Souvenir Money/Kiff Loses Barry".
- November 26:
  - Walt Disney Animation Studios' Zootopia 2 was released.
  - The third and final season of Skydance Animation's WondLa premiered on Apple TV.
  - The final 7 episodes from Season 2 of Kiff release on Disney+.
- November 27: Prep & Landing: The Snowball Protocol premiered on Disney Channel, and was released on Disney+ the following day.
- November 28:
  - Family Guy's second exclusive Halloween special for Hulu titled "Disney's Hulu's Family Guy's Hallmark Channel's Lifetime's Familiar Holiday Movie" was released.
  - A PAW Patrol Christmas premiered on CBS and Paramount+.

=== December ===
- December 1: The series finale of Blaze and the Monster Machines premiered on Nickelodeon.
- December 3: The development of Mr. Men Little Miss The Movie was announced to be in the works and will be co-produced by StudioCanal.
- December 5:
  - Diary of a Wimpy Kid: The Last Straw premiered on Disney+.
  - Danny Fenton & Sam Manson from Danny Phantom were added as skins to Fortnite.
- December 6: Tom and Jerry: Snowman's Land aired on Cartoon Network.
- December 10: The South Park season 28 finale premiered on Comedy Central.
- December 11:
  - Anime studio Gainax is officially dissolved.
  - Monsta Studio released Papa Zola The Movie.
- December 12: The seventh episode of The Amazing Digital Circus, titled "Beach Episode", was released on YouTube (on the GLITCH channel) and Netflix, episodes 5 and 6 were also released on Netflix the same day.
- December 13: The series finale of My Hero Academia premiered on Nippon TV in Japan, thus ending the show after 8 seasons spanning 170 episodes.
- December 15: Season 6 of The Creature Cases premiered on Netflix.
- December 18: The Wonderfully Weird World of Gumball gets renewed for a 3rd & 4th season.
- December 19:
  - Paramount Animation and Nickelodeon Movies' The SpongeBob Movie: Search for SquarePants was released.
  - SpongeBob SquarePants was added to Fortnite as a sidekick to celebrate the release of Search for SquarePants.
  - Angel Studios and Sunrise Animation Studios' David was released.
  - The Elephant premiered on Adult Swim.
  - Ryan Gillis officially confirms that his show StuGo was cancelled by Disney Channel.
- December 21:
  - The Season 2 finale of the 2024 Ranma ½ series remake by MAPPA premiered on Japanese terrestrial television and was released on Netflix shortly after.
  - The Loud House gets renewed for an 11th season.
- December 22: Season 2 of The Wonderfully Weird World of Gumball was released as a Hulu exclusive in the United States.
- December 23: It is announced that Avatar Aang: The Last Airbender will not be getting a theatrical release next year, it will instead be releasing exclusively on Paramount+.
- December 30: Longtime Winnie the Pooh actor Jim Cummings confirmed that Disney is making a new Winnie the Pooh movie.

== Awards ==
- Academy Award for Best Animated Feature: Flow
- Academy Award for Best Animated Short Film: In the Shadow of the Cypress
- American Cinema Editors Award for Best Edited Animated Feature Film: The Wild Robot
- Annecy International Animation Film Festival Cristal du long métrage: Sultana's Dream
- Annie Award for Best Animated Feature: The Wild Robot
- Annie Award for Best Animated Feature – Independent: Flow
- Annie Award for Best Animated Television Production: Bob's Burgers
- Astra Film Award for Best Animated Film: The Wild Robot
- Austin Film Critics Association Award for Best Animated Film: The Wild Robot
- BAFTA Award for Best Animated Film: Wallace and Gromit: Vengeance Most Fowl
- BAFTA Award for Best Short Animation: Wander to Wonder
- Boston Society of Film Critics Award for Best Animated Film: Flow
- Central Ohio Film Critics Association Awards for Best Animated Feature: The Wild Robot
- César Award for Best Animated Film: Flow
- Chicago Film Critics Association Award for Best Animated Film: Flow
- Critics' Choice Movie Award for Best Animated Feature: The Wild Robot
- Critics' Choice Television Award for Best Animated Series: X-Men '97
- Dallas–Fort Worth Film Critics Association Award for Best Animated Film: The Wild Robot
- European Film Award for Best Animated Feature Film: Flow
- Florida Film Critics Circle Award for Best Animated Film: Flow
- Golden Globe Award for Best Animated Feature Film: Flow
- Golden Reel Award for Outstanding Achievement in Sound Editing – Sound Effects, Foley, Dialogue and ADR for Animated Feature Film: The Wild Robot
- Goya Award for Best Animated Film: Black Butterflies
- Japan Academy Film Prize for Animation of the Year: Look Back
- Kids' Choice Award for Favorite Animated Movie: Inside Out 2
- Los Angeles Film Critics Association Award for Best Animated Film: Flow
- Minnesota Film Critics Alliance Award for Best Animated Feature: The Wild Robot
- NAACP Image Award for Outstanding Animated Motion Picture: Inside Out 2
- National Board of Review Award for Best Animated Film: Flow
- New York Film Critics Circle Award for Best Animated Film: Flow
- Online Film Critics Society Award for Best Animated Film: Flow
- Primetime Emmy Award for Outstanding Animated Program: Arcane
- Producers Guild of America Award for Best Animated Motion Picture: The Wild Robot
- San Diego Film Critics Society Award for Best Animated Film: Flow
- San Francisco Bay Area Film Critics Circle Award for Best Animated Feature: Flow
- Saturn Award for Best Animated Film: The Wild Robot
- Seattle Film Critics Society Award for Best Animated Feature: The Wild Robot
- St. Louis Film Critics Association Award for Best Animated Feature: The Wild Robot
- Tokyo Anime Award: Look Back
- Toronto Film Critics Association Award for Best Animated Film: Flow
- Visual Effects Society Award for Outstanding Visual Effects in an Animated Feature: The Wild Robot
- Washington D.C. Area Film Critics Association Award for Best Animated Feature: The Wild Robot

== Television series debuts ==
Date	Title	Channel, Streaming	Year
January 4	Totally Spies! (revival)	Cartoon Network, Max	2025–present
January 4	Medalist	TV Asahi, Disney+, Hulu	2025–present
January 5	Zenshu	TV Tokyo	2025
January 11	StuGo	Disney Channel, Disney XD, Disney+	2025
January 11	Sakamoto Days	Netflix/TV Tokyo	2025–present
January 16	Team Mekbots Animal Rescue	Peacock	2025
January 17	RoboGobo	Disney Jr., Disney+	2025–present
January 20	Wonderblocks	CBeebies	2025–present
January 29	Your Friendly Neighborhood Spider-Man	Disney+	2025–present
January 30	Mermicorno: Starfall	Max	2025–present
February 2	Common Side Effects	Adult Swim, Max	2025–present
February 13	Dog Days Out	Netflix	2025–present
February 14	Goldie	Apple TV+	2025–present
February 19	Win or Lose	Disney+	2025
March 3	Skillsville	PBS Kids	2025–2026
March 6	Lil Kev	BET+	2025–present
March 9	Oh My God... Yes!	Adult Swim	2025–present
March 20	Wolf King	Netflix	2025
March 21	Bearbrick	Apple TV+	2025–present
April 3	Devil May Cry	Netflix	2025–present
April 5	Iyanu: Child of Wonder	Cartoon Network, Max	2025–present
April 6	Lazarus	Adult Swim, Max	2025–present
April 6	Witch Watch	MBS, Crunchyroll, Netflix, Hulu	2025–present
April 6	Umamusume: Cinderella Gray	TBS, Netflix, Amazon Prime Video	2025–present
April 9	Apocalypse Hotel	Nippon TV, AT-X, Crunchyroll	2025
April 10	Moonrise	Netflix	2025–present
April 17	#1 Happy Family USA	Prime Video	2025–present
April 18	The Gaslight District	YouTube	2025–present
April 19	Super Duper Bunny League	Nickelodeon, Nick Jr.	2025–present
April 30	Asterix & Obelix: The Big Fight	Netflix	2025–present
June 5	Phineas and Ferb (revival)	Disney Channel, Disney XD, Disney+	2025–present
June 6	Wylde Pak	Nickelodeon	2025–present
June 6	Mr. Men Little Miss Mini Adventures	YouTube	2025–present
June 13	Not a Box	Apple TV+	2025
July 3	Milky Subway: The Galactic Limited Express	YouTube	2025
July 6	The Summer Hikaru Died	Netflix/Nippon TV	2025–present
July 6	Gachiakuta	CBC, TBS, Crunchyroll	2025–present
July 6	The Fragrant Flower Blooms with Dignity	Netflix, Tokyo MX, GYT, GTV, MBS, BS11, AT-X	2025
July 7	City the Animation	Tokyo MX, Amazon Prime Video	2025
June 28	Takopi's Original Sin	Crunchyroll, Netflix, Amazon Prime Video, Abema	2025
July 10	7 Bears	Netflix	2025
July 10	Leviathan	Netflix	2025–present
July 21	Mickey Mouse Clubhouse+	Disney Jr., Disney+	2025–present
July 24	My Melody & Kuromi	Netflix	2025
July 28	The Wonderfully Weird World of Gumball	Hulu, Cartoon Network	2025–present
August 1	Eyes of Wakanda	Disney+	2025
August 4	King of the Hill (revival)	Hulu	2025–present
August 11	Iron Man and His Awesome Friends	Disney Jr., Disney+	2025–present
August 17	Women Wearing Shoulder Pads	Adult Swim, HBO Max	2025–present
August 22	Long Story Short	Netflix	2025–present
September 8	Weather Hunters	PBS Kids	2025–present
September 8	Dr. Seuss's Red Fish, Blue Fish	Netflix	2025–present
September 9	Lost in McDonaldland	YouTube	2025
September 10	Helluva Boss	Prime Video	2025–present
September 19	Haunted Hotel	Netflix	2025–present
September 19	Knights of Guinevere	YouTube	2025–present
September 23	Paris & Pups	YouTube	2025–present
September 24	Marvel Zombies	Disney+	2025–present
October 2	Charlotte's Web	HBO Max	2025–present
October 2	Winx Club: The Magic Is Back	Netflix	2025–present
October 6	Dr. Seuss's Horton!	Netflix	2025–present
October 10	Kurukshetra	Netflix	2025–present
October 14	Splinter Cell: Deathwatch	Netflix	2025–present
October 17	The Chosen Adventures	Prime Video	2025–present
October 19	Haha, You Clowns	Adult Swim, HBO Max	2025–present
October 30	Talking Tom Heroes: Suddenly Super	CBeebies	2025–present
October 31	Gupi	Netflix	2025–present
November 6	The Bad Guys: The Series (Note: Initially named "The Bad Guys: Breaking In" for its first season.)	Netflix	2025–present
November 10	Bat-Fam	Prime Video	2025–present
November 13	Koati	Netflix	2025–present
November 19	The Mighty Nein	Prime Video	2025–present

== Television series endings ==
Date	Title	Channel, Streaming	Year	Notes
January 14	Baby Shark's Big Show!	Nick Jr.	2020–2025	Cancelled
January 25	Craig of the Creek	Cartoon Network	2018–2025	Ended
February 21	The Adventures of Paddington	Nick Jr.	2019–2025	Ended
February 28	Dragon Ball Daima	Fuji Television	2024–2025	Ended
March 3	Hot Wheels Let's Race	Netflix	2024–2025	Cancelled
March 6	The Tiny Chef Show	Nickelodeon, Nick Jr.	2022–2025	Cancelled
March 6	Jellystone!	Max	2021–2025	Ended
March 8	Moon Girl and Devil Dinosaur	Disney Channel, Disney XD, Disney+	2023–2025	Ended
March 12	Win or Lose	Disney+	2025	Ended
March 17	Morphle and the Magic Pets	Disney Jr., Disney+	2024–2025	Ended
March 22	Tiny Toons Looniversity	HBO Max, Cartoon Network	2023–2025	Ended
March 23	Zenshu	TV Tokyo	2025	Ended
April 13	Hamster & Gretel	Disney Channel, Disney XD, Disney+	2022–2025	Ended
April 25	Mickey Mouse Funhouse	Disney Jr., Disney+	2021–2025	Ended
April 27	Primos	Disney Channel, Disney XD, Disney+	2024–2025	Cancelled
May 3	StuGo	Disney Channel, Disney XD, Disney+	2025	Cancelled
May 8	Blood of Zeus	Netflix	2020–2025	Ended
May 23	Big Mouth	Netflix	2017–2025	Ended
May 23	Kindergarten: The Musical	Disney Jr., Disney+	2024–2025	Cancelled
June 25	Apocalypse Hotel	Nippon TV, AT-X, Crunchyroll	2025	Ended
July 10	Leviathan	Netflix	2025	Cancelled
August 2	Takopi's Original Sin	Crunchyroll, Netflix, Amazon Prime Video, Abema	2025	Ended
August 13	Sausage Party: Foodtopia	Amazon Prime Video	2024–2025	Cancelled
September 11	Wolf King	Netflix	2025	Cancelled
September 11	Thomas & Friends: All Engines Go	Cartoonito/Netflix	2021–2025	Cancelled
September 14	The Great North	Fox	2021–2025	Ended
September 18	Milky Subway: The Galactic Limited Express	YouTube	2025	Cancelled
September 29	City the Animation	Tokyo MX, Amazon Prime Video	2025	Ended
October 13	Solar Opposites	Hulu	2020–2025	Ended
November 8	Barney's World	HBO Max	2024–2025	Cancelled
November 20	Jurassic World: Chaos Theory	Netflix	2024–2025	Cancelled
November 22	Boboiboy Galaxy	YouTube	2016–2025	Ended
November 26	WondLa	Apple TV	2024–2025	Ended
December 1	Blaze and the Monster Machines	Nickelodeon, Nick Jr.	2014–2025	Ended
December 3	Pinkalicious & Peterrific	PBS Kids	2018–2025	Ended
December 4	Firebuds	Disney Jr.	2022–2025	Ended
December 5	Transformers: EarthSpark	Paramount+	2022–2025	Ended
December 8	Star Wars: Young Jedi Adventures	Disney Jr.	2023–2025	Ended
December 11	Tomb Raider: The Legend of Lara Croft	Netflix	2024-2025	Ended
December 12	Tales of the Teenage Mutant Ninja Turtles	Paramount+, Nickelodeon	2024–2025	Cancelled
December 13	My Hero Academia	NNS (ytv, NTV) (Japan)	2016–2025	Ended

== Television season premieres ==
Date	Title	Season	Channel, Streaming
January 18	Chibiverse	3	Disney Channel, Disney XD
February 6	Invincible	3	Prime Video
February 16	Grimsburg	2	Fox
March 1	Teen Titans Go!	9	Cartoon Network, HBO Max
March 15	Kiff	2	Disney Channel, Disney XD
March 21	The Patrick Star Show	4	Nickelodeon
April 4	Wind Breaker	2	JNN, Crunchyroll
May 23	Big Mouth	8	Netflix
May 25	Rick and Morty	8	Adult Swim (Cartoon Network)
June 5–6	Phineas and Ferb	5 (Note: The show was revived for two more seasons in January 2023 after having originally ended in 2015.)	Disney Channel, Disney XD, Disney+
June 9	The Creature Cases	5	Netflix
June 27	SpongeBob SquarePants	16	Nickelodeon
July 18	Paw Patrol	12	Nickelodeon (Note: Season later premiered in Canada on TVO on August 2nd.)
July 23	South Park	27	Comedy Central
August 1	The Loud House	9	Nickelodeon
August 4	King of the Hill	14 (Note: The show was revived for two more seasons in January 2023 after having originally ended in 2010.)	Hulu
August 6	The Proud Family: Louder and Prouder	3	Disney+
September 15	Futurama	10	Hulu
September 28	Bob's Burgers	16	Fox
September 28	Krapopolis	3	Fox
September 28	The Simpsons	37	Fox
September 28	Universal Basic Guys	2	Fox
October 5	Ranma ½	2	Nippon TV, Netflix
October 5	Smiling Friends	3	Adult Swim (Cartoon Network), HBO Max
October 6	Family Guy	24	Hulu (Note: The season initially premiered on Hulu with two exclusive Holiday specials, the season will make its official premiere on Fox on February 15, 2026.)
October 15	South Park	28	Comedy Central
October 29	Hazbin Hotel	2	Prime Video
November 7	Rock Paper Scissors	2	Nickelodeon
December 15	The Creature Cases	6	Netflix
December 22	The Wonderfully Weird World of Gumball	2	Hulu (Note: Season later premiered internationally on Cartoon Network on February 2, 2026)

== Television season finales ==
Date	Title	Season	Channel, Streaming
March 14	Invincible	3	Prime Video
March 22	Tiny Toons Looniversity	2	Max
March 24	American Dad!	21	TBS
April 26	Chibiverse	3	Disney Channel, Disney XD
May 10	Paw Patrol	11	TVO (Note: Season later concluded in the US on Nickelodeon on August 15th.)
May 18	Krapopolis	2	Fox
May 18	The Simpsons	36	Fox
June 20	SpongeBob SquarePants	15	Nickelodeon
June 20	Wind Breaker	2	JNN, Crunchyroll
June 27	Mr. Men Little Miss Mini Adventures	1	YouTube
July 17	Family Guy	23	Fox
July 17	Grimsburg	2	Fox
July 25	The Loud House	8	Nickelodeon
July 27	Rick and Morty	8	Adult Swim (Cartoon Network)
July 28	The Wonderfully Weird World of Gumball	1	Hulu (Note: Season later concluded internationally on Cartoon Network on October 30th.)
July 30	Big City Greens	4	Disney+ (Note: The season finale later aired on Disney Channel & Disney XD on August 9, 2025.)
August 4	King of the Hill	14	Hulu
August 6	The Proud Family: Louder and Prouder	3	Disney+
August 14	Bob's Burgers	15	Fox
September 14	The Great North	5	Fox
September 15	Futurama	10	Hulu
September 24	South Park	27	Comedy Central
October 15	Lost in McDonaldland	1	YouTube
November 6	The Bad Guys: The Series (Note: Initially named "The Bad Guys: Breaking In" for its first season.)	1	Netflix
November 19	Hazbin Hotel	2	Prime Video
November 22	Kiff	2	Disney Channel, Disney XD
November 29	Paw Patrol	12	TVO (Note: Season later concluded in the US on Nickelodeon on March 3, 2026.)
November 30	Smiling Friends	3	Adult Swim (Cartoon Network), HBO Max
December 10	South Park	28	Comedy Central
December 21	Ranma ½	2	Nippon TV, Netflix
December 22	The Wonderfully Weird World of Gumball	2	Hulu

== Deaths ==
=== January ===
- January 1: Wayne Osmond, American musician (voiced himself in The Osmonds), dies at age 73.
- January 5:
  - Benoît Allemane, French voice actor (French dub voice of Foghorn Leghorn in the Looney Tunes franchise, Ronan the Accuser in The Super Hero Squad Show, Mayor Hamilton Hill in Batman: The Animated Series, Silverback in Batman Unlimited: Animal Instincts, Doctor X in Action Man, Narrator in Teen Titans, voice of Akeltonon in Mummy Nanny, Santa Claus in Santa's Apprentice, Yule in Mune: Guardian of the Moon, Narrator in Snow White: The Sequel), dies at age 82.
  - Jim Short, Australian-born American comedian (voice of Keith Richards in the God, the Devil and Bob episode "Keith Richards"), dies at age 58.
- January 6: Dale Wilson, Canadian actor (voice of Ja-Kal in Mummies Alive!, Cell, Kami and Android 8 in the Ocean dub of Dragon Ball Z, Paw Pooch in Krypto the Superdog, Java in Martin Mystery, Akuma in Street Fighter, Robert Kelly in X-Men: Evolution and Iron Man: Armored Adventures, Clow Reed in the Nelvana dub of Cardcaptor Sakura, Captain Grid-Iron in G.I. Joe: A Real American Hero, Wreckage in G.I. Joe Extreme, Smokescreen and Hoist in Transformers: Armada, Mudflap in Transformers: Cybertron, Machine Man and Electro in Spider-Man Unlimited, Knuck in Action Man, Toa Lewa and Turaga Onewa in Bionicle: Mask of Light, provided additional voices for Extreme Dinosaurs), dies at age 82.
- January 8: Charles Kay, British actor (voice of Capulet in the Shakespeare: The Animated Tales episode "Romeo and Juliet"), dies at age 94.
- January 10: Christopher Benjamin, English actor (voice of Rowf in The Plague Dogs, Duke Frederick and Corin in the Shakespeare: The Animated Tales episode "As You Like It"), dies at age 90.
- January 11: Joel Paley, American screenwriter (Cats Don't Dance), dies at age 69.
- January 12: Robert Machray, American actor (voice of Principal in Rapsittie Street Kids: Believe in Santa), dies at age 79.
- January 13: Nathalie Dupree, American cookbook writer and television personality (played herself in the Space Ghost Coast to Coast episode "Cookout"), dies at age 85.
- January 15: Patricia Lyfoung, French comic artist and animator (Totally Spies!, Action Dad), dies at age 47.
- January 16:
  - David Lynch, American director (Six Men Getting Sick (Six Times)), visual artist, musician and actor (voice of Gus the Bartender in The Cleveland Show, Mad Scientist in Robot Chicken, all characters in DumbLand, himself in the Family Guy episode "How the Griffin Stole Christmas"), dies at age 78.
  - Bob Uecker, American baseball player, sportscaster, actor and comedian (voice of the Narrator in the Teacher's Pet episode "Take Me Out of the Ball Game", Baseball Announcer in the Puppy Dog Pals episode "Take Me Out to the Pug Game", Bob Yucker in the Monsters at Work episode "The Damaged Room", himself in the Futurama episode "A Leela of Her Own" and the Teen Titans Go! episode "BBRBDAY"), dies at age 90.
  - Joan Plowright, English actress (voice of Baylene in Dinosaur, Ms. Plushbottom in Curious George), dies at age 95.
- January 17:
  - Robert Verrall, Canadian animator (The Romance of Transportation in Canada, What on Earth!, Cosmic Zoom), dies at age 97.
  - Jules Feiffer, American cartoonist and screenwriter (Munro), dies at age 95.
- January 25: Olga James, American singer and actress (voice of Mrs. Thomas in Sealab 2020), dies at age 95.
- January 29: Joe Hale, American animator (Sleeping Beauty, The Black Cauldron, The Great Mouse Detective, Robin Hood, Mickey's Christmas Carol), producer (The Black Cauldron) and screenwriter (The Black Cauldron), dies at age 99.
- January 30: Dick Button, American figure skater and analyst (voiced himself in the Animaniacs episode "All the Words in the English Language"), dies at age 95.

=== February ===
- February 2: Brian Murphy, English actor (voice of Len Pond in Pond Life, Dr. Attticus in Hilltop Hospital), dies at age 92.
- February 4: Ed Seeman, American animator (Casper the Friendly Ghost, Popeye), dies at age 93.
- February 9: William H. Bassett, American actor (voice of Counterfeiter and Whispering Councilman in the Manga Video dub of The Castle of Cagliostro, Principal in the 2001 dub of Akira, Magician in Catnapped!, Elder in Appleseed, Chief Cabinet Secretary Takakura in Ghost in the Shell: Stand Alone Complex, Swampmonster in Avatar: The Last Airbender, Toba Islander in the Mermaid Forest episode "Togyo no sato part 2", Frog in the Cowboy Bebop episode "Mushroom Samba", Yuri Hussler in the Mobile Suit Gundam 0083: Stardust Memory episode "A Storm Raging Through", provided additional voices for Ah! My Goddess: The Movie), dies at age 89.
- February 11: Jerry Eisenberg, American animator (The Peter Potamus Show, My Little Pony, Frankenstein Jr. and The Impossibles, Super Friends, Spider-Man, House of Mouse), dies at age 87.
- February 12: Biff Wiff, American actor (voice of Drifter, Keeper and Sgt. Hind in Kiff), dies at age 76.
- February 14: Alice Hirson, American actress (voice of Mrs. Johnson in Baby Blues, Peg Chapman in the Godzilla: The Series episode "Wedding Bells Blew", Mrs. Perry in the Trash Truck episode "Pranks"), dies at age 95.
- February 16: Julian Holloway, British actor (voice of Odlaw in Where's Wally?, Bradford Milbanks in James Bond Jr., Captain Zed in Captain Zed and the Zee Zone, Digby in Dan Dare: Pilot of the Future, Siegfried Fischbacher in Father of the Pride, Prime Minister Almec and Admiral Kilian in Star Wars: The Clone Wars, Death in Regular Show), dies at age 80.
- February 18: Gene Hackman, American actor (voice of General Mandible in Antz), dies at age 95.
- February 20: Peter Jason, American actor (voice of Manny in The New Batman Adventures, Coach Creager in Batman Beyond, Coach in Hair High, Exterminator in The Secret World of Arrietty, Nix in Mixels, Mason in the Batman: The Animated Series episode "It's Never Too Late", Royal Treasurer in the Happily Ever After: Fairy Tales for Every Child episode "The Emperor's New Clothes", Bobby Nacht in the Pinky and the Brain episode "Hoop Schemes", Farmer MacDonald in the Jackie Chan Adventures episode "The Amazing T-Troop"), dies at age 80.
- February 21: Lynne Marie Stewart, American actress (voice of Shirley Feeney in Mork & Mindy/Laverne & Shirley/Fonz Hour, Jessica Morganberry and young Clark Kent in Superman, Aunt Harriet in Batman: Return of the Caped Crusaders and Batman vs. Two-Face, Kitty Grunewald in Life with Louie, Clara, Izzie's Mother, and Beatrice in Izzie's Way Home, Sister Agnes and Barb Kleffman in Mike Tyson Mysteries, Mona Lisa in The Tick episode "Leonardo da Vinci and His Fightin' Genius Time Commandos!", Violet in the Batman: The Animated Series episode "Eternal Youth", additional voices in Barnyard, Family Dog, and A Pup Named Scooby-Doo), dies at age 78.
- February 24: Fumi Kitahara, American animation publicist (DreamWorks Animation, Aardman Animations, Laika, LLC, Walt Disney Animation Studios), dies at age 56.
- February 25:
  - Baoan Coleman, Vietnamese-American actor (voice of Mr. Hyunh in Hey Arnold!), dies at age 85.
  - Roberto Orci, Mexican-American screenwriter and producer (Transformers: Prime), dies at age 51.
- February 26: Michelle Trachtenberg, American actress (voice of Valkyrie in The Super Hero Squad Show, Bar Girl in DC Showcase: Jonah Hex, Blood Moon in the SuperMansion episode "A Midsummer Night's Ream", Judy Reilly in Human Kind Of, Dr. Wagner in the Harriet the Spy episode "I Am the Onion"), dies at age 39.
- February 28: David Johansen, American singer, songwriter and actor (voice of Shayol in Gandahar, Beartaur in Centaurworld, Bus Driver in Cats Don't Dance, Ding Dong Daddy in the Teen Titans episode "Revved Up"), dies at age 75.

=== March ===
- March 2: George Lowe, American voice actor and comedian (voice of Space Ghost in Space Ghost Coast to Coast and Cartoon Planet), dies at age 67.
- March 6: Josef Zíma, Czech actor (Czech dub voice of Bashful in Snow White and the Seven Dwarfs, Kaa in The Jungle Book), dies at age 92.
- March 11:
  - Dave Mallow, American voice actor (voice of Mao Mao, Oculi and Chao in Dragon Ball, Upamon, Angemon and Sepahimon in Digimon Adventure, Otamamon and Tokomon in Digimon Data Squad, Amarao in FLCL, Mr. Barnes and Granpa in Lego Friends), dies at age 76.
  - Clive Revill, New Zealand actor (voice of Kickback in The Transformers, King Nod in The Thief and the Cobbler, the Mighty Om in The Legend of Prince Valiant, Lyle Spanger, Baffeardin and Hermil Sioro in Freakazoid!, Galeo in Snorks, Potsworth in Midnight Patrol: Adventures in the Dream Zone, narrator in Mickey's Twice Upon a Christmas, King Claudius in the Pinky and the Brain episode "Melancholy Brain", Shedlock Jones in the DuckTales episode "Dr. Jekyll and Mr. Duck", Professor Grimace in the MoonDreamers segments of My Little Pony, first voice of Alfred Pennyworth in Batman: The Animated Series), dies at age 94.
- March 12: Takashi Inagaki, Japanese voice actor (voice of Mosquito in Soul Eater, Cain in The Seven Deadly Sins, Joseph Dzhugashgvili in Saga of Tanya the Evil: The Movie, Godo in the Berserk episode "Epiphany", Japanese dub voice of the Warden in Megamind, Magic Mirror in House of Mouse, Palpatine in Star Wars: The Clone Wars and Star Wars: Rebels), dies at age 87.
- March 13: Sofia Gubaidulina, Soviet and Russian composer (Adventures of Mowgli, The Cat Who Walked by Herself), dies at age 93.
- March 17: David Steven Cohen, American screenwriter (Courage the Cowardly Dog, Balto, ALF Tales, Tiny Toon Adventures, Kenny the Shark, Arthur, Peg + Cat, Little People, Space Racers), dies at age 58.
- March 18: Yôko Kawanami, Japanese voice actress (voice of Bulma's Mother in the Dragon Ball franchise, Arcee in Transformers: The Headmasters, Mrs. Bellum in Powerpuff Girls Z), dies at age 67.
- March 21: George Foreman, American boxer (voice of George Fisticuff in the Garfield and Friends episode "Food Fighters", himself in the King of the Hill episode "Boxing Luanne"), dies at age 76.
- March 29: Richard Chamberlain, American actor (voice of Highfather in Justice League: Gods and Monsters, Zigg in the ThunderCats episode "Forest of Magi Oar"), dies at age 90.
- March 31: Patty Maloney, American actress (voice of Tanis the Mummy in Scooby-Doo and the Ghoul School, Darla in The Little Rascals, Blue Eyes in The Smurfs, Mrs. Segar in The New Batman Adventures episode "Double Talk", provided additional voices for The Lord of the Rings), dies at age 89.

=== April ===
- April 1: Val Kilmer, American actor (voice of Moses and God in The Prince of Egypt, Bogardus in Delgo, Bravo in Planes), dies at age 65.
- April 2: Alois Švehlík, Czech actor (voice of Wachek Sr. in Alois Nebel, Czech dub voice of Amos Slade in The Fox and the Hound, Vahúr in The Little Fox, Samson's father in Samson & Sally, Chuckles in Toy Story 3), dies at age 85.
- April 3: John Saint Ryan, English actor (voice of King Arthur in Gargoyles), dies at age 72.
- April 4: Paul Fierlinger, Czech-American animator, and director (Teeny Little Super Guy, My Dog Tulip), dies at age 89.
- April 5: Colin Fox, Canadian actor (voice of the Wizard in The Care Bears Adventure in Wonderland, Mr. Hinkle in My Pet Monster, King Harkinian in The Legend of Zelda segments of The Super Mario Bros. Super Show!, Large Head in The NeverEnding Story, Uatu in Silver Surfer, Winchester in The Dating Guy, Supreme Overlord Maximus I.Q. in Atomic Betty, Dr. Blood in Bolts & Blip, Purple Man in the X-Men: The Animated Series episode "No Mutant is an Island", provided additional voices for Beetlejuice, Babar, Wild C.A.T.s), dies at age 86.
- April 6: Jay North, American actor (voice of Prince Turhan in the Arabian Knights segment of The Banana Splits, Terry Dexter in Here Comes the Grump, Bamm-Bamm Rubble in The Pebbles and Bamm-Bamm Show, himself in The Simpsons episode "Take My Wife Sleaze"), dies at age 73.
- April 7:
  - William Finn, American composer and lyricist (The Brave Little Toaster to the Rescue, The Brave Little Toaster Goes to Mars, The Adventures of Tom Thumb and Thumbelina), dies at age 73.
  - Marvin Levy, American film publicist (DreamWorks Pictures, Amblin Entertainment, Columbia Pictures), dies at age 96.
- April 8: Nicky Katt, American actor (voice of Leland Lizard in The Get Along Gang, Artist in the King of the Hill episode "Cecil N'est Pas Une King of the Hill" and Dr. Brown in the episode "The Incredible Hank"), dies at age 54.
- April 10: Nino Tempo, American singer and saxophonist (voice of Black Bart and Luigi in Garfield: His 9 Lives, Herbie in Garfield Goes Hollywood, Monkey in Garfield in Paradise, Lt. Washington in Garfield's Babes and Bullets), dies at age 90.
- April 15:
  - Wink Martindale, American disc jockey and game show host (voice of Sphinx Martindale in the Hercules episode "Hercules and the Driving Test", Wink Martiandale in The Jetsons episode "ASTRONomical I.Q."), dies at age 91.
  - Ken Shiroyama, Japanese voice actor (voice of Ebizō in Naruto Shippuden, Dr. Meisel in Spriggan, Gametsu in UFO Warrior Dai Apolon, Japanese dub voice of Eustace Bagge in Courage the Cowardly Dog, Frenzy, Perceptor, Trailbreaker, Sideswipe in The Transformers), dies at age 92.
- April 18: Noreen Young, Canadian actress (voice of Baby Hugs in The Care Bears Battle the Freeze Machine, additional voices in Tukiki and His Search for a Merry Christmas), dies at age 85.
- April 23: Lulu Roman, American comedian and singer (voice of Lulu Ladybug in the Gaither's Pond episode "Fish Tales"), dies at age 78.
- April 28: Andrew Karpen, American studio executive (Focus Features), dies at age 59.
- April 30: Mark Thornton, Canadian animator (Grojband, Looped, Thumbelina, The Pebble and the Penguin, Anastasia, Titan A.E., Joseph: King of Dreams, Beauty and the Beast: The Enchanted Christmas, Stickin' Around, Space Jam, Osmosis Jones, Jacob Two-Two, The Jungle Book 2, 6teen, Clone High, Total Drama, Fangbone!, Arctic Dogs), screenwriter (Grojband, Looped), director (Grojband, Looped, Total Drama, Open Season: Call of Nature) and producer (Grojband), dies at age 55.

=== May ===
- May 1: Ruth Buzzi, American actress and comedian (voice of Granny Goodwitch in Linus the Lionhearted, Gladys in Baggy Pants and the Nitwits, Mama Bear in The Berenstain Bears, Nose Marie in Pound Puppies, Felonia Funk in Rockin' with Judy Jetson, Suzie Kabloozie and Feff in Sesame Street, Delilah in Sheep in the Big City, Nandy in Cro, Miss Fresno in the Gravedale High episode "Monster on Trial", singing voice of Frou-Frou in The Aristocats), dies at age 88.
- May 2:
  - Jim Smith, American animator (Mighty Mouse: The New Adventures, The New Adventures of Beany and Cecil, McGee and Me!, Tiny Toon Adventures, The Oblongs, Electric City, Cans Without Labels), storyboard artist (DIC Entertainment, Defenders of the Earth, Spiral Zone, Mighty Mouse: The New Adventures, Warner Bros. Animation, Poochini, Samurai Jack, The X's, The Haunted World of El Superbeasto, YooHoo & Friends, Cans Without Labels), character designer (Samurai Jack), background artist (Over the Garden Wall), musician, writer (Samurai Jack), director (The New Adventures of Beany and Cecil), and producer (The Ren & Stimpy Show, co-founder of Spümcø), dies at age 70.
  - Michael Alaimo, American actor (Doctor in Space Jam), dies at age 86.
- May 3: Steve Pepoon, American screenwriter (The Simpsons, The Wild Thornberrys), dies at age 68.
- May 6: Fakhri Odeh, Kuwaiti actor (Kuwaiti dub voice of Lepka in Future Boy Conan), dies at age 75.
- May 8: Jiří Bartoška, Czech actor (voice of Dr. Dubsky in Living Large), dies at age 78.
- May 9: Peter Morwood, Irish novelist and screenwriter (Batman: The Animated Series, Gargoyles, Spider-Man Unlimited), dies at age 68.
- May 13: John Bryson, American politician and former director of The Walt Disney Company, dies at age 81.
- May 15: Charles Strouse, American composer (Alice in Wonderland or What's a Nice Kid like You Doing in a Place like This?, All Dogs Go to Heaven), dies at age 96.
- May 16: Meta Velander, Swedish actress (voice of Elsa in Pettson och Findus – Kattonauten, Swedish dub voice of Mrs. Potts in Beauty and the Beast, Beauty and the Beast: The Enchanted Christmas and Belle's Magical World, Madame Medusa in The Rescuers, Amelia Gabble in The Aristocats, Orddu in The Black Cauldron, The Mouse Queen in The Great Mouse Detective, Mrs. Hogenson in The Incredibles), dies at age 100.
- May 20: George Wendt, American actor (voice of Ràoul and Member of the Claws in Garfield on the Town, Ranger #2 in Garfield in the Rough, Johnny Throat and Punchie in The Romance of Betty Boop, Grandpa Frank in Fancy Nancy, Gigi in I Lost My Body, Norm Peterson in The Simpsons episode "Fear of Flying" and the Family Guy episodes "Road to Rupert" and "Three Kings"), dies at age 76.
- May 24: Peter David, American comic book writer and screenwriter (Young Justice, Ben 10, Roswell Conspiracies: Aliens, Myths and Legends), dies at age 68.
- May 26:
  - Co Hoedeman, Dutch-Canadian animator (The Sand Castle, Ludovic: The Snow Gift, Winter Days), dies at age 84.
  - Frances Doel, British screenwriter (Aladdin and the Adventure of All Time), dies at age 83.
- May 27: Peter Kwong, American actor (voice of Mr. Ho in the King of the Hill episode "A Man Without a Country Club"), dies at age 73.
- May 29: Alf Clausen, American composer (The Simpsons, The Critic, Space Cats), dies at age 84.
- May 30:
  - Loretta Swit, American actress (voice of Marcia Cates in the Batman: The Animated Series episode "Mad as a Hatter", Judge in the I Am Weasel episode "Law of Gravity"), dies at age 87.
  - Renée Victor, American actress (voice of Abuelita in Coco, Dolores del Rey in Victor and Valentino, Gloria in the Fairfax episode "Fairfolks", Pottery Bot and Abuelatron in the Futurama episode "The One Amigo", Latin American dub voice of Laverne in The Hunchback of Notre Dame, Mombi in The Wonderful Wizard of Oz, provided additional voices for The Addams Family), dies at age 86.

=== June ===
- June 1: Jonathan Joss, American actor (voice of Pow Wow Smith in the Justice League Unlimited episode "The Once and Future Thing Part One: Weird Western Tales", Ooloopie/Mean Polar Bears in The Wild Thornberrys episode "Polar Opposites", continued voice of John Redcorn in King of the Hill, provided additional voices for Pocahontas II: Journey to a New World), dies at age 59.
- June 3:
  - Eugen Doga, Moldovan composer (Maria, Mirabela), dies at age 88.
  - Jason Constantine, American film executive (Lionsgate Films), dies at age 55.
- June 8: Ewa Dałkowska, Polish actress (Polish dub voice of Pearl Gesner in Home on the Range), dies at age 78.
- June 11:
  - Brian Wilson, American musician (voiced himself in the Duck Dodgers episode "Surf the Stars"), dies at 82.
  - Ayumu Saito, Japanese actor (voice of Wabisuke Jin'ouchi in Summer Wars), dies at age 60.
- June 12: Clifton Jones, Jamaican-British actor (voice of Blackavar in Watership Down), dies at age 87.
- June 17: Gailard Sartain, American actor (voice of Case Manager in the King of the Hill pilot, Big Daddy in The Simpsons episode "The Simpsons Spin-Off Showcase", Big O in The Angry Beavers episode "Sqotters") and screenwriter (The Angry Beavers), dies at age 81.
- June 21: Valentina Talyzina, Soviet and Russian actress (voice of Uncle Fyodor's mother in Three from Prostokvashino and its sequels), dies at age 90.
- June 29: Bob Elmore, American stuntman (provided stunts for The Adventures of Rocky and Bullwinkle), dies at age 65.
- June 30: Saverio Indrio, Italian voice actor (Italian dub voice of Damien Drake in Looney Tunes: Back in Action, James P. Sullivan in the Monsters, Inc. franchise, King Neptune in The SpongeBob SquarePants Movie, Jackson in Bee Movie, Senator in Space Chimps, Noctus in Legend of the Guardians: The Owls of Ga'Hoole, Race Bannon in Tom and Jerry: Spy Quest, Picadilly in Curious George 2: Follow That Monkey!, Chuck Berost in The Looney Tunes Show, Steve Barkin in Kim Possible, Hak Foo in Jackie Chan Adventures, Baileywick in Sofia the First, Admiral Zhao in Avatar: The Last Airbender, Mysterio in Spider-Man: The Animated Series, Charles in Eureka Seven, Dark Kat in SWAT Kats: The Radical Squadron, Pug in 101 Dalmatians: The Series, Rat King in Teenage Mutant Ninja Turtles, Ra in Samurai Jack, Zombozo in Ben 10, Nick Fury in The Avengers: Earth's Mightiest Heroes, Dicko in Love, Death & Robots, Takeshi Oii in Death Note, Man-At-Arms in Masters of the Universe, King Randor in He-Man and the Masters of the Universe), dies at age 62.

=== July ===
- July 2: Julian McMahon, Australian-American actor (voice of Doctor Doom in the Robot Chicken episode "Monstourage"), dies at age 56.
- July 3: Michael Madsen, American actor (voice of Kilowog in Green Lantern: First Flight, Duke in Arctic Dogs, Kevin Costner in the Bob's Burgers episode "Moody Foodie"), dies at age 67.
- July 4: Bill Flynn, American voice actor (voice of Hiroshi Agasa in Funimation dub of Case Closed, Genzo in One Piece, Roy in Attack on Titan), dies at age 86.
- July 8: James Carter Cathcart, American voice actor (voice of Professor Oak, James, Meowth and Gary Oak in the Pokémon franchise, Meano in The Ping Pong Club, Prince Philionel el de Seyruun in Slayers, Dr. Change in Private Psycho Lesson, Miki Kaoru in Revolutionary Girl Utena: The Movie, Black Cat in Space Travelers: The Animation, Kumi's Borg in Alien Nine, Weevil Underwood in Yu-Gi-Oh! Duel Monsters, Cyclonis Tarb in Tokyo Mew Mew, Vector the Crocodile in Sonic X), dies at age 71.
- July 10:
  - Bun Hay Mean, French comedian and actor (French dub voice of Donald Moderate in One Piece: Stampede), dies at age 43.
  - Phil Mulloy, British animator (Cowboys, Intolerance), dies at age 76.
- July 14:
  - Andrey Sokolov, Russian animator (Mr. Bean: The Animated Series, What a Cartoon!) and storyboard artist (Mike, Lu & Og), dies at age 51.
  - Ron Wells, American voice actor (voice of Zidgel in 3-2-1 Penguins!), dies at age 63.
- July 18: Harry Standjofski, Canadian actor (Security Guard in Playmobil: The Movie, voice of Brother Tuck in Young Robin Hood, V.P. Larden in Pig City, Uncle Fred in Arthur, Bobby Singer in Supernatural: The Animation, Darkar in Winx Club, The Crow and the Green Fisherman in Pinocchio, provided additional voices for The Country Mouse and the City Mouse Adventures, The Tofus), dies at age 66.
- July 20: Malcolm-Jamal Warner, American actor (voice of The Producer in The Magic School Bus, Lieutenant Scruffy in The Chicken Squad, Henry in the Adventures from the Book of Virtues episode "Faith", Lester Biggs in the Static Shock episode "Duped", Robber in the Stripperella episode "The Bridesmaid", Braden's Dad in the Special Agent Oso episode "The Living Holiday Lights"), dies at age 54.
- July 22:
  - Tsunehiko Kamijō, Japanese actor (voice of Mamma Autoto Boss in Porco Rosso, Gonza in Princess Mononoke, Kasshu in Doraemon: Nobita's Great Adventure in the South Seas, Chichiyaku in Spirited Away, Japanese dub voice of Sebastian in The Little Mermaid, Colonel Kit Coyote in Go Go Gophers), dies at age 85.
  - Chuck Mangione, American flugelhornist (voiced himself in King of the Hill), dies at age 84.
  - Ozzy Osbourne, English musician and television personality (voice of King Thrash in Trolls World Tour, Fawn in Gnomeo & Juliet and Sherlock Gnomes, Duke of Drear in The 7D episode "Bummer Vacation", Sid Fishy in the Bubble Guppies episode "Super Guppies!", Earth Troll in the Fish Hooks episode "Legend of the Earth Troll", himself in the South Park episode "Chef Aid"), dies at age 76.
- July 24: Hulk Hogan, American professional wrestler (portrayed himself in Hulk Hogan's Rock 'n' Wrestling, voice of various characters in Robot Chicken, The Dean in China, IL, Terrafirminator V.O. in Gnomeo & Juliet, himself in Robot Chicken, the American Dad! episode "Stanny Tendergrass", and Camp WWE), dies at age 71.
- July 29: Alon Abutbul, Israeli actor (voice of Morando in 3Below: Tales of Arcadia), dies at age 60.

=== August ===
- August 2: Kelley Mack, American actress (provided additional voices for Spider-Man: Into the Spider-Verse), dies at age 33.
- August 3: Loni Anderson, American actress (voice of Flo in All Dogs Go to Heaven, Blondie Bumstead in Blondie & Dagwood, and Blondie & Dagwood: Second Wedding Workout, herself in the Duck Dodgers episode "A Lame Duck Mind"), dies at age 79.
- August 4: Dominique Collignon-Maurin, French actor (voice of Spartakus in Spartakus and the Sun Beneath the Sea, Transformer in Gandahar, French dub voice of Hades in Hercules, Randall Boggs in Monsters, Inc., Wart in The Sword in the Stone, Gill in Finding Nemo, Rat in Fantastic Mr. Fox, Mandrake in Epic), dies at age 76.
- August 9: Ivan Krasko, Russian actor (voice of the King in Little Longnose, Svyatogor in Alyosha Popovich and Tugarin Zmey, Russian dub voice of the Narrator in Hercules), dies at age 94.
- August 10: David Ketchum, American actor (voice of the Announcer in Roger Ramjet) and screenwriter (Captain Caveman and the Teen Angels, The Funky Phantom, The Roman Holidays, Jeannie, Wait Till Your Father Gets Home, The Scooby-Doo/Dynomutt Hour), dies at age 97.
- August 13:
  - Nicolas Beaucaire, French actor (French dub voice of Saotome in Colorful, Kesha in Space Dogs: Adventure to the Moon, Syaoran in Tsubasa: Reservoir Chronicle, Yukio "Koyuki" Tanaka in Beck, Tim in Devil May Cry: The Animated Series, Shito Tachibana in Zombie-Loan, Jiro in Blue Dragon, Ginji in Victory Kickoff!!, Ordo in Four Knights of the Apocalypse), dies at age 52.
  - Tomo Sakurai, Japanese voice actress (voice of Cynthia in Pokémon, Grisha no haha in Attack on Titan, Anila Aurobindo Ghose in Fafner in the Azure, Lilith's Mother in Holy Knights, Sora Asuka in The World God Only Knows, Misao Makimachi in Rurouni Kenshin), dies at age 53.
- August 15: Tristan Rogers, Australian actor (voice of Jake in The Rescuers Down Under, Nohrin Officer in Delgo, Hawkins in The Real Adventures of Jonny Quest episode "Ndovu's Last Journey", Simon Harper in the Batman Beyond episode "Sentries of the Last Cosmos"), dies at age 79.
- August 17: Terence Stamp, English actor (voice of Captain Severus in Ultramarines: A Warhammer 40,000 Movie, Professor Menace in the Static Shock episode "Blast from the Past"), dies at age 87.
- August 18: Jorge Maestro, Argentine screenwriter (Jungle Tales), dies at age 73.
- August 20:
  - Tatsuya Nagamine, Japanese director (Dragon Ball Super: Broly, Dragon Ball: The Path to Power, Digimon: The Movie, One Piece) and animator (Dragon Ball Super: Broly, One Piece, Dragon Ball Z Kai), dies at age 53.
  - Humpy Wheeler, American racing executive (voice of Tex in the Cars franchise), dies at age 86.
- August 21: Kurt-Hans Goedicke, German-born English timpanist (An American Tail, An American Tail: Fievel Goes West, Once Upon a Forest, We're Back! A Dinosaur's Story), dies at age 90.
- August 23: Joel Sill, American music supervisor (Animalympics, Space Chimps, The Adventures of Rocky and Bullwinkle), dies at age 78.
- August 25: Frank Price, American studio executive (Columbia Pictures, Universal Pictures), dies at age 95.
- August 26: Edward Faulkner, American actor (voice of Elf Ziggy in Elf Sparkle Meets Christmas the Horse, Chef Best in Elf Sparkle and the Special Red Dress) and director (Elf Sparkle and the Special Red Dress), dies at age 93.
- August 27: Takaya Hashi, Japanese voice actor (voice of Kakuzu in the Naruto franchise, Toki in Fist of the North Star, John Winchester in Supernatural: The Animation, Hayakawa in Doomed Megalopolis, Ketto's Father in Kiki's Delivery Service, Alex Rey in Black Jack, Kumazawa in Twilight of the Dark Master, Lyon in Metropolis, Dr. Kestner in Appleseed Ex Machina, High Seeker in Dragon Age: Dawn of the Seeker, Obadiah Stane in Iron Man: Rise of Technovore, Izamura in Patema Inverted, Dr. Traum in Hug! PreCure, Niander Wallace Sr. in Blade Runner: Black Lotus, Donovan Desmond in Spy × Family), dies at age 72.
- August 30: Harrie Geelen, Dutch illustrator, film director and animator (Toonder Studios), dies at age 86.
- August 31: Radna Sakhaltuev, Ukrainian animator (Adventures of Captain Wrongel, Treasure Island, Cossacks), dies at age 90.

=== September ===
- September 1:
  - Graham Greene, Canadian actor (voice of Lost Land Shaman in Turok: Son of Stone, Brown Bear in the Happily Ever After: Fairy Tales for Every Child episode "Snow White"), dies at age 73.
  - Gerry Matthews, American actor (voice of Sugar Bear in Linus the Lionhearted), dies at age 94.
- September 2: Kazuko Yoshiyuki, Japanese actress (voice of Toki in Ponyo, Nanny in Where Marnie Was There), dies at age 90.
- September 3: Stephen Mendillo, American actor (voice of Boyer in The Invincible Iron Man), dies at age 84.
- September 4: Ted Mann, Canadian-American screenwriter (The Real Ghostbusters), dies at age 72.
- September 5: Mark Volman, American musician and composer (Down and Dirty Duck, Strawberry Shortcake, Peter and the Magic Egg, The Adventures of the American Rabbit), dies at age 78.
- September 7:
  - Stuart Craig, English production designer (The Cat Returns), dies at age 83.
  - Philippe Vidal, French animator, director and creator (The Garfield Show, Belfort & Lupin, Garfield Originals, Boule et Bill), dies at age 59.
- September 10:
  - Norbert Lemire, Canadian painter and animator (Princess Sissi), dies at age 76.
  - Paula Shaw, American actress (voice of Bubbie in The Guava Juice Show episode "Gauntlet of Grannies"), dies at age 84.
- September 11: Emmanuel Karsen, French actor (French dub voice of Duke Weaselton in Zootopia, Human Torch in Fantastic Four, Pete in The Mask: Animated Series, Raven in Gargoyles, Ryuk in Death Note, Kizaru in One Piece, Ginyu in Dragon Ball Z Kai), dies at age 62.
- September 15: Ron Friedman, American screenwriter (G.I. Joe: A Real American Hero, G.I. Joe: The Movie, The Transformers, The Transformers: The Movie, The Romance of Betty Boop, Bionic Six, Fantastic Four, Iron Man), producer (Iron Man, Fantastic Four) and actor (voice of Blastaar in the Fantastic Four episode "Behold the Negative Zone", Record Producer in the Iron Man episode "Iron Man to the Second Power"), dies at age 93.
- September 16: Robert Redford, American actor (voice of Ike the Horse in Charlotte's Web), dies at age 89.
- September 22:
  - Enver Petrovci, Kosovar actor (Albanian dub voice of Mufasa in The Lion King franchise), dies at age 71.
  - Lee Weaver, American actor (voice of Alpine in G.I. Joe: A Real American Hero, G.I. Joe: The Movie), dies at age 95.
- September 23: Nancylee Myatt, American producer (Teacher's Pet) and screenwriter (Teacher's Pet, Recess, Lloyd in Space), dies at age 68.
- September 26: Esa Saario, Finnish actor (Finnish dub voice of Mufasa in The Lion King franchise), dies at age 93.
- September 29: Yury Chernavsky, Russian composer (Wings, legs and tails, Investigation Held by Kolobki), dies at age 78.
- September 30: Renato Casaro, Italian film poster artist (The Care Bears Movie) and title designer (Asterix and the Big Fight), dies at age 89.

=== October ===
- October 1: Jane Goodall, English zoologist (voiced herself in The Wild Thornberrys episode "The Trouble with Darwin" and The Simpsons episode "Gorillas on the Mast"), dies at age 91.
- October 3:
  - Kimberly Hébert Gregory, American actress (voice of Nicole Williams in Craig of the Creek, Fuller in No Activity), dies at age 52.
  - Nina Gulyayeva, Russian actress (voice of Tsarevna in Beloved Beauty, Buratino in The Adventures of Buratino, Cipollino in Cipollino, the Little Mermaid in The Little Mermaid), dies at age 94.
  - Patricia Routledge, English actress (voice of Cousin Ribby in The World of Peter Rabbit and Friends), dies at age 96.
- October 5: Jerry Tokofsky, American studio executive (Columbia Pictures), dies at age 91.
- October 7: Ian Freebairn-Smith, American composer (You're a Good Man, Charlie Brown), dies at age 93.
- October 10: John Lodge, English musician (voiced himself in The Simpsons episode "Viva Ned Flanders"), dies at age 82.
- October 11:
  - Albert Cohen, Israeli actor (Hebrew dub voice of King Harold in the Shrek franchise, Mr. Smee in Peter Pan, Merlin in The Sword in the Stone, Anger in Inside Out, Vitruvius in The Lego Movie, Professor Derek Knight in Monsters University, Bulldog in Planes, Slinky Dog in Toy Story 4), dies at age 93.
  - Diane Keaton, American actress (voice of Jenny in Finding Dory, Michellee in Green Eggs and Ham), dies at age 79.
- October 13: Drew Struzan, American film poster artist (The Fox and the Hound, The Secret of NIMH, An American Tail, The Land Before Time, All Dogs Go to Heaven, DuckTales the Movie: Treasure of the Lost Lamp, Aladdin, We're Back! A Dinosaur's Story, All Dogs Go to Heaven 2, Anastasia, Spirit: Stallion of the Cimarron, How to Train Your Dragon 2, Animal Crackers), dies at age 78.
- October 15:
  - Jackie Berger, Belgian actress (French dub voice of Gizmo in Teen Titans and Teen Titans Go!, Edmund Pevensie in The Lion, the Witch and the Wardrobe, Martin in The Secret of NIMH, Jerry in Tom and Jerry: The Movie, Louis in We're Back! A Dinosaur's Story, Richie Rich in Richie Rich, Pugsley Addams in The Addams Family, Paco in Jackie Chan Adventures, Jimmy Jones and Natalie Tennyson in Ben 10: Ultimate Alien, Eve and Mary Hughes in Fairy Tail), dies at age 77.
  - Samantha Eggar, English-American actress (voice of Hera in the Hercules franchise, Whale in Metalocalypse, Guinevere in The Legend of Prince Valiant, Ms. O'Mally in P.J. Sparkles, Queen Isabella in The Magic Voyage), dies at age 86.
- October 16:
  - Klaus Doldinger, German composer (Peter in Magicland), dies at age 89.
  - Ace Frehley, American guitarist and songwriter (voice of Dr. Naniltred Faniltendriten in the Metalocalypse episode "DeathHealth" and Member With Shirt With Number 7 in the episode "Deathsiduals", himself in the Family Guy episode "A Very Special Family Guy Freakin' Christmas", and the KaBlam! episode "KaBlam! James KaBlam!"), dies at age 74.
- October 20: Asrani, Indian actor (Hindi dub voice of Zazu in The Lion King), dies at age 84.
- October 23: June Lockhart, American actress (voice of Martha Day in These Are the Days, Mother in Peter-No-Tail, Aladdin's Mother in Aladdin and the Wonderful Lamp, Aunt Millie in the Pound Puppies episode "How to Found a Pound", Vesta in Wildfire, Mrs. Nelson in the Duckman episode "America the Beautiful", Mrs. Brainchild in The Ren & Stimpy Show episode "Blazing Entrails", Timmy's Mother in the Johnny Bravo episode "Johnny, Real Good", herself in The Critic episode "All the Duke's Men"), dies at age 100.
- October 24: Paul Hüttel, Danish actor (voice of Agra in Strings, Danish dub voice of Grimsby in The Little Mermaid, Mr. Ping in the Kung Fu Panda franchise), dies at age 90.
- October 27: Prunella Scales, English actress (voice of Mrs. Tiggy-Winkle in The World of Peter Rabbit and Friends, Queen in Freddie as F.R.O.7), dies at age 93.
- October 28: Ilona Kassai, Hungarian actress (Hungarian dub voice of Katara in Avatar: The Last Airbender, Kaede in Inuyasha, Gru's Mother in Despicable Me 3), dies at age 97.

=== November ===
- November 2:
  - Betty Harford, American actress (voice of Gumba in The Gumby Show), dies at age 98.
  - Jim Self, American tubist and composer (Finding Nemo, Finding Dory, Cars, Cars 3, Planes, Beauty and the Beast, Aladdin, The Princess and the Frog, Batman: The Animated Series, Superman: The Animated Series, Mulan, The Little Mermaid), dies at age 82.
- November 3: Jacqueline Cohen, French voice actress (French dub voice of Rita in Monsters vs. Aliens), dies at age 91.
- November 4: Elina Salo, Finnish actress (Finnish dub voice of Little My in Moomin), dies at age 89.
- November 8: Tatsuya Nakadai, Japanese actor (voice of the Devil in Belladonna of Sadness, Narrator in Final Yamato, Sumiyaki no Roujini in The Tale of the Princess Kaguya, old Junpei Senō in Giovanni's Island), dies at age 92.
- November 9: John Laws, Australian radio and television presenter (voice of Rumpus Bumpus in The Magic Pudding), dies at age 90.
- November 11:
  - Cleto Escobedo III, American musician (Alpha and Omega), dies at age 59.
  - Sally Kirkland, American actress (voice of Older Woman in Nerdland), dies at age 84.
- November 14:
  - Dan McGrath, American screenwriter (The Simpsons, King of the Hill, Gravity Falls, The PJs, Mission Hill), producer (The Simpsons, King of the Hill, Mission Hill) and actor (voice of Jamaican Radio Rapper in the King of the Hill episode "Full Metal Dust Jacket"), dies at age 61.
  - Todd Snider, American singer (voice of Lobster Freak in the Squidbillies episode "Clowny Freaks"), dies at age 59.
- November 18: Julio Fernández Rodríguez, Spanish producer (El Cid: The Legend, Pinocchio 3000, El Ratón Pérez, Nocturna, Donkey Xote), dies at age 78.
- November 20: Paul van Gorcum, German-born Dutch actor (Dutch dub voice of Jasper in the 101 Dalmatians franchise, Zazu in The Lion King franchise, Rabbit in The New Adventures of Winnie the Pooh, Gargamel in The Smurfs, Shere Khan in TaleSpin), dies at age 91.
- November 23: Udo Kier, German actor (voice of Professor Pericles in Scooby-Doo! Mystery Incorporated, Mister Toad in Beware the Batman, Music Master in the Justice League episode "Legends", Herbert ”Bert” Zeigler in The Batman episode "Q&A"), dies at age 81.
- November 24:
  - Jimmy Cliff, Jamaican composer (Squidbillies) and actor (himself in the Space Ghost Coast to Coast episode "Speck"), dies at age 81.
  - Jorga Kotrbová, Czech actress (Czech dub voice of the Princess in Rainbow Brite and the Star Stealer, Andrea Beaumont in Batman: Mask of the Phantasm, Queen Ant in Antz), dies at age 78.
- November 29:
  - Tomomichi Nishimura, Japanese voice actor (voice of Steeljaw and Cyclonus in Transformers: The Headmasters, Clock Tower Keeper in Kiki's Delivery Service, Gail in Supernatural: The Animation, Kuru in Dragon Ball Super, Anzai in Slam Dunk, Narrator in YuYu Hakusho, Japanese dub voice of Topolino in Cars 2), dies at age 79.
  - Tony Benedict, American screenwriter (The Flintstones, The Jetsons, Yogi Bear, Huckleberry Hound, The Pink Panther, Looney Tunes, Heathcliff, Saturday Supercade, Mr. Magoo, Popeye), dies at age 88.

=== December ===
- December 2: David Matalon, American studio executive (TriStar Pictures, Regency Enterprises), dies at age 82.
- December 4:
  - Eduardo Manzano, Mexican actor (voice of Don Calcaneo in Marcianos vs. Mexicanos, Khan in Nikté, Latin American voice of Trollstice Bergen in Trolls), dies at age 87.
  - Arunee Nanthiwat, Thai voice actress (Thai dub voice of Chichi, Android 18 and Dende in Dragon Ball Z, Sailor Mars and Sailor Jupiter in Sailor Moon, Ranma Saotome in Ranma ½, Syaoran Li in Cardcaptor Sakura, Mai Kujaku in Yu-Gi-Oh! Duel Monsters), dies at age 69.
  - Cary-Hiroyuki Tagawa, Japanese-American actor (voice of Brushogun in Teen Titans: Trouble in Tokyo, Hashi in Kubo and the Two Strings, Sumo Kuma in Teenage Mutant Ninja Turtles, Alrich Wren in Star Wars: Rebels, Master Eiji in Blue Samurai, Akita in the DuckTales episode "Astro B.O.Y.D.!"), dies at age 75.
- December 5: Frank Gehry, Canadian–American architect and designer (voiced himself in The Simpsons episode "The Seven-Beer Snitch" and the Arthur episode "Castles in the Sky"), dies at age 96.
- December 8: Gordon Goodwin, American composer (Freakazoid!, Wild West C.O.W.-Boys of Moo Mesa, Road Rovers, The Legend of Tarzan, The Sylvester & Tweety Mysteries, Animaniacs, Pinky and the Brain, Toonsylvania, Histeria!, Bah, Humduck! A Looney Tunes Christmas, Tom and Jerry Tales), dies at age 70.
- December 9: Béatrice Picard, Canadian actress (French dub voice of Marge Simpson in The Simpsons, Baylene in Dinosaur, Coco in Coco), dies at age 96.
- December 10:
  - Jim Ward, American voice actor (Count Dracula in The Super Mario Bros. Super Show! episode "Bats in the Basement/Mario and the Beanstalk", voice of Doug Dimmadone and Chet Ubetcha in The Fairly OddParents, Captain Quark in Ratchet & Clank, Commissioner Gordon in Batman: Return of the Caped Crusaders, Hugo Strange in Batman vs. Two-Face, Hun Soldier in Mulan, Diamondhead, XRL8 and Wildvine in Ben 10, Herr Kleiser in Ultimate Avengers, Professor X in Wolverine and the X-Men and The Super Hero Squad Show episode "Mysterious Mayhem at Mutant High!", Baron Strucker and Henry Peter Gyrich in The Avengers: Earth's Mightiest Heroes, Paul Revere in the Time Squad episode "Horse of Horrors", Mordru in the Legion of Super Heroes episode "Trials", Albert Einstein in The Mummy episode "The Black Forest", River Spirit in Spirited Away, provided additional voices for Shrek 2), dies at age 66.
  - Jeffrey Garcia, American actor and stand-up comedian (voice of Sheen Estevez in the Jimmy Neutron franchise, Pip in the Barnyard franchise, Rinaldo in Happy Feet and Happy Feet Two, Tipa and Bat in Rio, Spoonbill and Perl in Rio 2, Jerry Rivera in the ChalkZone episode "Indecent Exposure", Jesus Christo in the Clone High episode "A.D.D.: The Last 'D' is for Disorder", Ricardo Amino in the Ozzy & Drix episode "Tricky Ricardo", Tookie Tomas in The Proud Family episode "Who You Callin' a Sissy?"), dies at age 50.
- December 11: Stanley Baxter, Scottish actor (voice of Gofer and Slap in The Thief and the Cobbler, Maisie Mac in Meeow!), dies at age 99.
- December 14:
  - Ryō Ishihara, Japanese voice actor (voice of Cyborg 002 in Cyborg 009), dies at age 94.
  - Anthony Geary, American actor (voice of John and Juan in Teacher's Pet), dies at age 78.
  - Rob Reiner, American director, and actor (voice of Screwie in Everyone's Hero, himself in The Simpsons episode "Million Dollar Abie"), dies at age 78.
- December 15: Wayne Moss, Canadian director (Shining Time Station, Noddy), dies at age 71.
- December 16:
  - Gil Gerard, American actor (voice of Megatronus/The Fallen in Transformers: Robots in Disguise), dies at age 82.
  - Jefferson Utanes, Filipino voice actor (Filipino dub voice of Goku in Dragon Ball Z, James in Pokémon, Mr. Krabs in Spongebob Squarepants, Doraemon in Doraemon, Shrek in Shrek, Ben Tennyson in Ben 10, Genie in Aladdin, Mickey Mouse, Knuckles the Echidna in Sonic Prime), dies at age 46.
- December 17:
  - Juli Erickson, American actress (voice of Pinako Rockbell in Fullmetal Alchemist, Setsu in Samurai 7, Ogen Iga in Basilisk, Stargazer in Darker than Black, Ohba in Fairy Tail), dies at age 86.
  - Eddie Sotto, American artist and animator (One Saturday Morning), dies at age 67.
- December 19: Claude Berda, French studio executive (AB Groupe), dies at age 78.
- December 21: Loren Carpenter, American computer graphics researcher and developer (Pixar), dies at age 78.
- December 30: Isiah Whitlock Jr., American actor (voice of River Scott in Cars 3, Commander Burnside in Lightyear, Bird King in Hoppers, C.E.O. in the BoJack Horseman episode "Head in the Clouds", Mayor Naise in the Apple & Onion episode "Election Day"), dies at age 71.
