= Conflict of Interest (South Park) =

- South Park episode
- Episode no.: Season 27; Episode 5
- Directed by: Trey Parker
- Written by: Trey Parker
- Production code: 2705
- Original air date: September 24, 2025

Episode chronology
← Previous "Wok Is Dead"	Next → "Twisted Christian"
- South Park season 27

"Conflict of Interest" is the fifth and final episode of the twenty-seventh season of the American animated television series South Park and the 333rd episode of the series overall. It premiered on Comedy Central on September 24, 2025. In the episode, students at South Park Elementary bet on prediction market apps, and one of the bets asks whether Kyle Broflovski's mother will strike Gaza and destroy a Palestinian hospital. Her search for the source of the bet takes her to Israel, where she confronts prime minister Benjamin Netanyahu. A second storyline has Donald Trump trying to end Satan's pregnancy and repeatedly injuring FCC chairman Brendan Carr by accident. It was the second episode in the series delayed a week from its original airdate due to production delays, after season 17's Goth Kids 3: Dawn of the Posers. It was the first episode to air after the assassination of Charlie Kirk, who was parodied earlier in this season in Got a Nut; sources speculated that the delay was due to the assassination, which was denied by Stone and Parker. It turned out to be the last episode of the season, although it was not announced as a finale.

== Plot ==
At South Park Elementary, the students are betting on prediction-market apps, with wagers on things like whether the girls' soccer team will win on Friday or whether there will be a snow day. One bet asks whether Kyle's mother, Sheila, will "strike Gaza and destroy a Palestinian hospital". Kyle, who is Jewish, is furious and calls the company behind the app. He is passed from office to office, including a call with Donald Trump Jr., who appears as a strategic advisor for prediction markets, and is eventually sent to the Federal Communications Commission, where he reaches Carr. Carr says he needs to speak to the president right away. Eric Cartman did not create the bet, but he sees that the odds go up whenever Kyle gets angry. He calls it a conflict of interest and sets out to keep Kyle angry and to spread talk about Sheila that pushes the odds higher. Soon the other mothers begin asking Sheila what she thinks about Gaza so they can decide how to bet. She snaps at them, insisting that American Jews should not have to answer for Israel's actions and that the conflict is between Israel and Palestine, not Jews and Palestine, and says she will find out where the bet came from.

In Washington, Trump and Satan are waiting for the birth of their child. JD Vance tells Trump that the baby will change his life, including by cutting into his time at parties at Mar-a-Lago, and Trump decides to get rid of it. He sets a series of traps for Satan, including a trip wire on a staircase, a soup loaded with Plan B pills and cat litter meant to give Satan toxoplasmosis. Carr, who has come to the White House about Kyle's complaint, keeps walking into the traps and getting hurt instead. He ends up in the hospital in a body cast, and a doctor warns that if the toxoplasmosis parasite reaches his brain, he may lose his freedom of speech. It is revealed that Vance also wants the baby gone, and he threatens Carr that they can do this the easy way or the hard way, a line taken from Carr's own comments about ABC and Jimmy Kimmel Live!.

Sheila flies to Israel and storms into Netanyahu's office. She tells him he is killing thousands of people and flattening neighborhoods, then using Judaism as a shield against criticism, and that he has made life harder for Jews, especially in the United States. The episode ends on her tirade, which is set to the theme music from Curb Your Enthusiasm as a nod to the character Susie Greene.

== Production ==
The episode was scheduled for September 17, 2025. That day, Trey Parker and Matt Stone announced that it would not air, writing that "when you do everything at the last minute sometimes you don't get it done", and "This one's on us". The Hollywood Reporter wrote that they blamed their own procrastination.

The delay came a week after the assassination of conservative activist Charlie Kirk on September 10. Kirk had been parodied in the season's second episode, "Got a Nut", and Comedy Central took repeats of that episode off its schedule after his death, though it stayed available on streaming. Some viewers suspected the delay was censorship, which Parker and Stone denied. Consequence wrote that the delay was officially blamed on the missed deadline but was likely also meant to put some distance between the show and the events around Kirk's death. Jimmy Kimmel Live! had returned the night before the episode aired, after a suspension that followed pressure from Carr on its parent company, Disney, over Kimmel's comments about Kirk's killing.

The next episode, "Twisted Christian", aired three weeks later as the first episode of season 28.

== Reception ==
Zach Vasquez of The Guardian wrote that the episode had little to say about Kirk's death directly, although it dealt with the aftermath in a roundabout way. He thought it might be the funniest episode of the season, if not the most outrageous, and praised the cartoon-style gags and the caricature of Vance. In his view, the episode did not meet the moment head-on but did not back down either.

Nicholas Quah of Vulture called it fairly standard South Park despite its open criticism of Israel. He said the swerve into Gaza showed that the show had not softened after the delay, and that what stood out was the anticipation around its release, similar to the buzz around Kimmel's return the night before.

Ben Sherlock of Screen Rant ranked "Conflict of Interest" third of the season's five episodes. He praised its handling of the debate over Israel and Gaza in the United States and said it brought the focus back to Kyle and Cartman, but he found the Trump subplot flat and wrote that Carr falling down stairs was not enough as a satirical critique of him.

The episode was watched by 0.55 million viewers in the United States.

Additionally, the episode was the show's first direct treatment of the war in Gaza. Israeli outlets including The Times of Israel, Ynet and The Jerusalem Post reported on Sheila's confrontation with Netanyahu. Netanyahu did not comment on it. The Post noted that some viewers criticized the episode as factually incorrect and anti-Israel, while others embraced it. Betar US, a Zionist activist group, accused the episode of promoting "lazy antisemitism" and said it blamed Israel for rising antisemitism, which drew opposing responses on social media. Some fans said they worried the show would be suspended for criticizing Israel, while others welcomed the scene.
