= Sickofancy =

- South Park episode
- Episode no.: Season 27; Episode 3
- Directed by: Trey Parker
- Written by: Trey Parker
- Production code: 2703
- Original air date: August 20, 2025

Episode chronology
← Previous "Got a Nut"	Next → "Wok Is Dead"
- South Park season 27

"Sickofancy" is the third episode of the twenty-seventh season of the American animated television series South Park and the 331st episode of the series overall. It premiered on Comedy Central on August 20, 2025. The episode focuses on Randy Marsh and Towelie attempting to save Tegridy Farms through technological rebranding, and parodies the tech industry's use of ketamine.

== Plot ==
After the latest United States Immigration and Customs Enforcement (ICE) arrests of Tegridy Farms workers, owner Randy Marsh tells his family they may have to sell the marijuana farm. His wife Sharon shares that while the family always supported him, having a marijuana farm was his dream, not theirs. Randy suggests talking to someone about their marriage, but instead of a counselor, he consults ChatGPT, much to the annoyance of Sharon, who points out that the sycophantic artificial intelligence (AI) software indiscriminately praises all his ideas. Randy and his sole remaining employee, Towelie, rebrand Tegridy Farms as a hybrid technology/marijuana company named Techridy. To bolster their focus and creativity, they also begin frequent microdosing of ketamine, which causes occasional disorientation for Randy.

Meanwhile, U.S. President Donald Trump sees a line of guests who shower him with gifts and praise, in particular the affirmation that he does not have a small penis. However, when he gets into bed with his lover, Satan, his abusive conduct drives Satan to also consult ChatGPT for help. Since marijuana remains illegal in many U.S. states, Randy sends Towelie with a gift to convince Trump to reclassify marijuana. However, when Towelie presents Randy's recorded message to Trump, the message reveals that Towelie himself is the gift.

When Sharon finds Randy in a ketamine-induced stupor, she adopts the pandering tone of ChatGPT, prompting him to confess that he has failed to change his company and that they have to sell the farm to pay their debts. After she agrees to do this for him, he gives her his cell phone, realizing he should stop using ChatGPT. A satisfied Sharon holds the phone, telling ChatGPT, “Fuck you, bitch!” At the White House, Satan and Towelie despair over being unable to escape from there.

== Reception ==
Wren Graves of Consequence gave "Sickofancy" a positive review and praised the episode's satire of AI, enjoying its realistic depiction of ChatGPT: "It's already programmed to kiss your ass, and if it's willing to tell you that your dream of selling salads made of french fries is wonderfully exciting and sure to succeed, do the writers even need to write a joke?" Zach Vasquez of The Guardian called the episode's portrayal of overreliance on AI "refreshingly clear-eyed, if not particularly incendiary". He also commended its timely commentary on recent events, particularly the declared emergency in Washington, D.C., adding that "no show has ever worked harder to have its finger on the nation's pulse."
