= American Cinema Editors Awards 2026 =

76th ACE Eddie Awards
- Presented by: American Cinema Editors
- Date: February 27, 2026
- Site: Royce Hall, Los Angeles, California

Highlights
- Best Film: Drama: Sinners
- Best Film: Comedy: One Battle After Another

The 76th American Cinema Editors Eddie Awards were presented on February 27, 2026, at the Royce Hall in Los Angeles, honoring the best editors in film and television of the previous year. The nominees were announced on January 27, 2026. To be eligible, films must have been released in theaters between January 1 and December 31, 2025, while television series must have aired between November 2, 2024, to December 31, 2025.

Filmmaker Ang Lee received the ACE Golden Eddie Filmmaker of the Year Award. Kim Larson, managing director and head of YouTube's Creator and Gaming team, will be accepting YouTube's ACE Visionary Award, while film editors Arthur Forney and Robert Leighton received career achievement honors.

== Winners and nominees ==
Winners and nominees are listed in alphabetical order. Winners are listed first and emphasized in bold.

=== Film ===
Best Edited Feature Film (Drama, Theatrical)	Best Edited Feature Film (Comedy, Theatrical)
**Sinners – Michael Shawver**; F1 – Stephen Mirrione; Hamnet – Chloé Zhao and Affonso Gonçalves; Sentimental Value – Olivier Bugge Coutté; Weapons – Joe Murphy	**One Battle After Another – Andy Jurgensen**; Bugonia – Yorgos Mavropsaridis; Marty Supreme – Ronald Bronstein and Josh Safdie; Wake Up Dead Man: A Knives Out Mystery – Bob Ducsay; Wicked: For Good – Myron Kerstein
Best Edited Documentary Feature (Theatrical)	Best Edited Animated Feature Film (Theatrical or Non-Theatrical)
**The Perfect Neighbor – Viridiana Lieberman**; Becoming Led Zeppelin – Dan Gitlin; It's Never Over, Jeff Buckley – Brian A. Kates and Stacy Goldate; John Candy: I Like Me – Shane Reid and Darrin Roberts; Ladies & Gentlemen... 50 Years of SNL Music – James Lester and Oz Rodríguez	**KPop Demon Hunters – Nathan Schauf**; The Bad Guys 2 – Jesse Averna; Zootopia 2 – Jeremy Milton
Best Edited Feature Film (Non-Theatrical)
**A Winter’s Song – Yvette M. Amirian (Prime Video)**; The Gorge – Frédéric Thoraval (Apple TV); Mountainhead – Bill Henry and Mark Davies (HBO Max); The Thursday Murder Club – Dan Zimmerman (Netflix)

=== Television ===
Best Edited Drama Series	Best Edited Single-Camera Comedy Series
**The Pitt: "6:00 P.M" – Mark Strand (HBO Max)**; Andor : "Who Are You?" – Yan Miles (Disney+); Pluribus: "We Is Us" – Skip Macdonald (Apple TV); Severance: "Chikhai Bardo" – Keith Fraase (Apple TV); Severance: "Cold Harbor" – Geoffrey Richman (Apple TV)	**The Studio: "The Promotion" – Eric Kissack (Apple TV)**; The Bear: "Bears" – Joanna Naugle (FX on Hulu); The Chair Company: "Life Goes by Too F**king Fast, It Really Does" – Stacy Moon (HBO); Hacks: "I Love L.A." – Susan Vaill (HBO Max); Only Murders in the Building: "The House Always…" – Shelly Westerman (Hulu)
Best Edited Multi-Camera Comedy Series	Best Edited Limited Series
**Frasier: "Murder Most Finch" – Russell Griffin (Paramount+)**; Mid-Century Modern: "Love Thy Neighbor" – Peter Chakos (Hulu); The Upshaws: "Tee'd Off" – Angel Gamboa Bryant (Netflix)	**The Penguin: "A Great or Little Thing" – Henk van Eeghen (HBO)**; The Beast in Me: "The Last Word" – Shelby Siegel (Netflix); Black Mirror: "USS Callister: Into Infinity" – Tony Kearns (Netflix); Death by Lightning: "The Man from Ohio" – Joseph Krings, Anna Hauger, Michael Ruscio, and Joe Leonard (Netflix); Dying for Sex: "It's Not That Serious" – Laura Weinberg and Steve Welch (FX on Hulu)
Best Edited Documentary Series	Best Edited Non-Scripted Series
**Pee-wee as Himself: "Part One" – Damian Rodriguez (HBO Max)**; Aka Charlie Sheen: "Part One" – Ed Greene (Netflix); Billy Joel: And So It Goes: "Episode 1" – Kris Liem, James Pilott, and Steven Ross (HBO Max); Mr. Scorsese: "All This Filming Isn't Healthy" – David Bartner (Apple TV); Sean Combs: The Reckoning: "Official Girl" – Evan Wise, Charles Divak, Jeremy Siefer, Jack Gravina, Benji Kast, Adam Goldstein, and Jonathan Miller (Netflix)	**Conan O'Brien Must Go: "Austria" – Matthew Shaw and Brad Roelandt (HBO Max)**; Love on the Spectrum: "Episode 7" – Leanne Cole, Gretchen Peterson, John Rosser, and Rachel Grierson-Johns (Netflix); The Traitors: "Let Battle Commence" – Patrick Owen and James Seddon-Brown (Peacock)
Best Edited Variety Talk/Sketch Show or Special	Best Edited Animated Series
**Saturday Night Live 50th Anniversary Special – Paul Del Gesso, Christopher Salerno, Ryan Spears, Sean Mcilraith, Ryan Mcilraith, and Daniel Garcia (NBC)**; Jimmy Kimmel Live!: "S24 E3273" – Jason Bielski (ABC); Last Week Tonight with John Oliver: "Medicare Advantage" – Anthony Miale (HBO / HBO Max)	**South Park: "Twisted Christian" – David List and Nate Pellettieri (Comedy Central / Paramount+)**; Bob's Burgers: "Grand Pre Pre-Pre-Opening" – Stephanie Earley and Jeremy Reuben (Fox); Love, Death + Robots: "Spider Rose" – Matt Mariska and Valerian Zamel (Netflix)

=== Others ===
Best Edited Short	Anne V. Coates Award for Student Editing
**All the Empty Rooms – Erin Casper, Stephen Maing, and Jeremy Medoff**; The Final Copy of Ilon Specht – Tim Johnson and Mónica Salazar; Gyopo – Mengyao Mia Zhang; The Second – Tony Zhou; Technicians – Lindsay Armstrong	**Luis Barragan – California State University, Fullerton**; Evan Nowack – Chapman University; Keaton Schallhorn – University of Oklahoma

== Honorary award ==
=== Career Achievement Award ===
- Arthur Forney
- Robert Leighton

=== Golden Eddie Filmmaker of the Year ===
- Ang Lee

=== Visionary Award ===
- Kim Larson
