= American Cinema Editors Award for Best Edited Animation (Non-Theatrical) =

Annual US television award

American Cinema Editors Award for Best Edited Animation – (Non-Theatrical)
- Awarded for: Best Editing for a Non-Theatrical Animation
- Country: United States
- Presented by: American Cinema Editors (ACE)
- Currently held by: David List and Nate Peliettieri – South Park (2025)
- Website: americancinemaeditors.org

The American Cinema Editors Award for Best Edited Animation – (Non-Theatrical) is one of the annual awards given by the American Cinema Editors. The award was first presented at the 2021 ceremony.

== Winners and nominees ==
=== 2020s ===
Year	Program	Episode	Nominees	Network
2020
2020	Rick and Morty	"Rattlestar Ricklactica"	Lee Harting	Adult Swim
2020	Big Mouth	"Nick Starr"	Felipe Salazar	Netflix
2020	BoJack Horseman	"Nice While It Lasted"	Brian Swanson	Netflix
2020	Bob's Burgers	"Bob Belcher and the Terrible, Horrible, No Good, Very Bad Kids"	Jeremy Reuben	Fox
2021
2021	Bob's Burgers	"Vampire Disco Death Dance"	Jeremy Reuben	Fox
2021	Rick and Morty	"Gotron Jerrysis Rickvangelion"	Lee Harting	Adult Swim
2021	What If...?	"What If... Ultron Won?"	Graham Fisher and Joel Fisher	Disney+
2022
2022	Love Death + Robots	"Bad Travelling"	Kirk Baxter	Netflix
2022	Big Mouth	"Dadda Dia!"	Felipe Salazar	Netflix
2022	Bob's Burgers	"Some Like It Bot Part 1: Eighth Grade Runner"	Jeremy Reuben	Fox
2023
2023	Blue Eye Samurai	"The Tale of the Ronin and the Bride"	Yuksa Shirasuna	Netflix
2023	Bob's Burgers	"Amelia"	Jeremy Reuben and Stephanie Earley	Fox
2023	Scott Pilgrim Takes Off	"Ramona Rents a Video"	Keisuke Yanagi	Netflix
2024
2024	X-Men '97	"Remember It"	Michelle McMillan	Disney+
2024	Bob's Burgers	"Butt Sweat and Fears"	Stephanie Earley and Jeremy Reuben	Fox
2024	The Simpsons	"Night of the Living Wage"	Don Barrozo	Fox
2025
2025	South Park	"Twisted Christian"	David List and Nate Peliettieri	Comedy Central
2025	Bob's Burgers	"Grand Pre-Pre-Pre-Opening"	Stephanie Earley and Jeremy Reuben	Fox
2025	Love Death + Robots	"Spider Rose"	Matt Mariska and Valerian Zamel	Netflix

== Statistics ==
=== Networks with multiple awards ===
2 awards

- Netflix

=== Programs with multiple nominations ===
6 nominations

- Bob's Burgers

2 nominations

- Big Mouth
- Love Death + Robots
- Rick and Morty

=== Editors with multiple nominations ===
6 nominations

- Jeremy Reuben

3 nominations

- Stephanie Earley

2 nominations

- Lee Harting
- Felipe Salazar

=== Networks with multiple nominations ===
7 nominations

- Fox
- Netflix

2 nominations

- Adult Swim
- Disney+
