= Twisted Christian =

- South Park episode
- Episode no.: Season 28; Episode 1
- Directed by: Trey Parker
- Written by: Trey Parker
- Production code: 2801
- Original air date: October 15, 2025

Episode chronology
← Previous "Conflict of Interest"	Next → "The Woman in the Hat"
- South Park season 28

"Twisted Christian" is the first episode of the twenty-eighth season of the American animated television series South Park and the 334th episode of the series overall. It premiered on Comedy Central on October 15, 2025. The episode focuses on Peter Thiel, who is brought to South Park Elementary to investigate the "6-7" meme, and it parodies Thiel's real-life lectures on the Antichrist and the film The Exorcist. It was expected to be the sixth episode of the show's twenty-seventh season, but it was instead listed as the first episode of the twenty-eighth without explanation.

== Plot ==
At South Park Elementary, the students are obsessed with the "6-7" meme, which is driving the teachers to distraction. PC Principal believes the meme is Satanic numerology and invites Peter Thiel to address the school. Thiel is introduced with a theme song announcing that he knows about the Antichrist, and he tells the students that the Antichrist could arrive in "6 to 7" weeks, which they cheer. Eric Cartman finds the joke so funny that he vomits every time he hears it, including during an MRI scan. Thiel decides the students belong to a cult, takes over the school's security system and downloads the students' data. Jesus, who now works at the school as a counselor, objects to the surveillance and is removed by PC Principal.

In Washington, D.C., Donald Trump and Satan attend a Lamaze class, where Trump complains that the pregnancy has ended their sex life. Vice President JD Vance wants to stop Satan from giving birth to Trump's child and persuades Trump to go to a Planned Parenthood clinic and ask a doctor to perform an abortion on Satan. Trump drops his trousers, and the doctor tells him they need an expert on the Antichrist, recommending Thiel. Vance, who is in contact with Thiel, promises him access to everyone's data if he can stop the baby. Thiel arrives at Cartman's house by Uber, to music from The Exorcist, and attempts an exorcism, which ends with Cartman vomiting pea soup on his face. When it fails, Thiel tells Cartman's mother that he must take Cartman to Washington, D.C., because he is the key to saving the country.

Meanwhile, Jesus is troubled by PC Principal's version of Christianity. PC Principal sets him up on a double date at The Cheesecake Factory with the school secretary Peggy Rockbottom. The date goes badly, and Jesus and PC Principal fight in the restaurant's bathroom. Jesus later returns to the restaurant and leaves with Peggy. The episode ends with Jesus cutting his robes, shaving his beard and flexing in a mirror.

== Reception ==
IGN's Jesse Schedeen gave "Twisted Christian" an 8 out of 10, calling it an entertaining addition to a strong run for the series. He praised how the episode fits its many plotlines together and described the storyline with Jesus and PC Principal as a logical extension of what had been building earlier in the season. He was less sure about Cartman as the center of the "6-7" subplot, which he saw as a sudden turn from the character's disillusionment earlier in the season, and wrote that the role could just as easily have gone to Stan or Kyle.

William Hughes of The A.V. Club wrote that the episode's Trump jokes felt tame by the series' standards. He considered the Jesus storyline the stronger part of the episode and said it suggested that Parker and Matt Stone still had more to say than mocking whichever conservative figure they could bait into responding.

== Accolades ==
At the 76th ACE Eddie Awards, held on February 27, 2026, at Royce Hall in Los Angeles, "Twisted Christian" won the award for Best Edited Animated Series. It was won by the episode's editors, David List and Nate Pellettieri. The other nominees were the Bob's Burgers episode "Grand Pre-Pre-Pre-Opening" and the Love, Death + Robots episode "Spider Rose".
