= South Park season 28 =

South Park
- Season 28
- Home media release cover
- No. of episodes: 5

Release
- Original network: Comedy Central
- Original release: October 15 – December 10, 2025

Season chronology
- ← Previous; Season 27 Next → Season 29

The twenty-eighth season of the American animated sitcom South Park premiered on Comedy Central on October 15, 2025, as a continuation of the story arc from the previous season. It consists of five episodes, starting with "Twisted Christian".

== Production ==
It was announced, on the day of what was expected to be the sixth episode of season 27, that the season had ended, and instead season 28 would be beginning with the episode aired on October 15, titled "Twisted Christian".

== Episodes ==
No. overall	No. in season	Title	Directed by	Written by	Original release date	Prod. code	U.S. viewers (millions)
334	1	"Twisted Christian"	Trey Parker	Trey Parker	October 15, 2025	2801	0.52
The children at South Park Elementary become obsessed with the 6-7 meme. Eric Cartman in particular finds the joke so funny he repeatedly makes it and then violently vomits afterwards. Peter Thiel, believing the meme is a cult that wants to bring about the Antichrist, comes to South Park Elementary and investigates the students in an attempt to find out how to stop the Antichrist from being born. Meanwhile, Donald Trump and JD Vance attempt to abort Satan's baby without his knowledge. JD Vance enlists Peter Thiel's help in doing so. While Thiel continues his investigation, PC Principal tries to show Jesus how Christianity is in the 2020s, which Jesus opposes and calls a warped version of the religion; however, Jesus gives in after being punched by PC Principal. At the same time, Thiel attempts to perform an exorcism on Cartman but fails. Regardless, Thiel says he must bring Cartman to Washington, D.C., to stop the Antichrist from being born.
335	2	"The Woman in the Hat"	Trey Parker	Trey Parker	October 31, 2025	2802	0.31
Stan Marsh and his family move in with Grampa Marsh at his retirement home due to still being poor after selling Tegridy Farms. Considering life in the town to now be undesirable, Stan teams up with Kyle Broflovski and Kenny McCormick to voice their opinions online, which hundreds of thousands of people agree with. At the same time, Trump starts to be haunted by a mysterious woman in a hat. Pam Bondi helps him investigate the supposed ghost. Stan creates a meme coin with the help of Kyle's cousin Kyle Schwartz as Stan's message becomes more popular. Schwartz heads to Washington, D.C., to discuss pumping and dumping the coin with Donald Trump Jr. He arrives just as the White House undergoes a seance to try to rid the house of the "ghost." During the seance, Schwartz gets scared and confesses that cryptocurrency is just a scam for the rich to get richer, which leads to him being arrested. Back at the retirement home, Stan continues to sulk over his living situation with Kyle and Kenny.
336	3	"Sora Not Sorry"	Trey Parker	Trey Parker	November 12, 2025	2803	0.53
After Butters Stotch and Red fight with each other by using Sora 2 to create revenge porn videos of themselves performing sexual acts with cartoon characters, the South Park police department is called to investigate. Unable to distinguish the difference between the video and reality, they believe that the cartoon characters are sexual predators. Three lawyers representing Studio Ghibli sue Butters and Kenny for their videos, but end up getting arrested by South Park's police department. Meanwhile, JD Vance manages to convince Donald Trump that he is doing what is best for him by conspiring to abort his and Satan's baby, and the two begin an affair. Peter Thiel continues to hold Eric Cartman hostage and generates videos of him to send to his mother. Eventually, the police realize that the videos were generated by artificial intelligence and arrest Thiel while freeing Cartman. The police also find security footage of Trump and Vance having sex with each other in the Lincoln Bedroom, which Trump successfully convinces Satan of being AI-generated to cover up his affair. Trump and Vance meet secretly once again and remain determined to get rid of Satan and his baby.
337	4	"Turkey Trot"	Trey Parker	Trey Parker	November 26, 2025	2804	0.37
The town of South Park holds a 5K turkey trot with a $5,000 reward sponsored by Saudi Arabia. Eric Cartman attempts to get Tolkien Black to join his team, believing him to be a fast runner due to race science, but Tolkien decides to stay home due to Saudi Arabia's human rights violations. Cartman takes Tolkien's Xbox, causing him to chase after him through the race. Meanwhile, Trump sends Pete Hegseth to retrieve Peter Thiel from jail, only for Hegseth to believe the runners are Antifa insurrectionists and disrupt the race with tear gas. Tolkien gets his Xbox back from Cartman amid the chaos and inadvertently crosses the finish line first, winning the $5,000 for his team. In the end, Hegseth is then thrown into jail with Thiel. As the police force takes off for Thanksgiving dinner, Hegseth declares that all of South Park will pay for this.
338	5	"The Crap Out"	Trey Parker	Trey Parker	December 10, 2025	2805	0.46
A depressed Stan Marsh wishes for a Christmas miracle to change his life for the better, inadvertently summoning the Woodland Critters. At the same time, Donald Trump and JD Vance arrive in South Park to free Peter Thiel and Pete Hegseth from jail, using Jesus to assist in their escape. Satan finally finds out from Towelie that Trump wants to abort their unborn child and goes to South Park to confront him, only to be hospitalized after going into labor. Trump and company arrive at the hospital, standing off against Stan, Towelie, and the Woodland Critters, only for Jesus to defect to Stan's side after Stan calls him out for losing faith in himself. While the standoff occurs, a doctor informs everyone that the unborn baby has committed suicide in Satan's womb. A depressed Satan packs up and leaves the White House as Trump celebrates, while Jesus grants Stan's prayers by giving the Marshes' old house back to the family.

== Home media ==
The twenty-eighth season, together with the twenty-seventh season, released together on October 20, 2026 in the United States.
