= South Park season 27 =

Season of television series

South Park
- Season 27
- Home media release cover
- No. of episodes: 5

Release
- Original network: Comedy Central
- Original release: July 23 – September 24, 2025

Season chronology
- ← Previous; Season 26 Next → Season 28

The twenty-seventh season of the American animated sitcom South Park premiered on Comedy Central on July 23, 2025. On July 21, 2025, it was announced that Trey Parker and Matt Stone had agreed to a new five-year deal with Paramount+ for the streaming rights, and for 10 episodes to be produced yearly. The season concluded on September 24, 2025, and season 28 began airing the following month, continuing season 27's story arc. The season included the Primetime Emmy Award-winning episode "Sermon on the 'Mount", which won the award for Outstanding Animated Program in 2026.

== Production ==
In September 2024, Parker and Stone stated that season 27 would not air until 2025, reasoning that they wanted to skip on parodying Donald Trump and the 2024 United States presidential election. However, the season featured a caricature of Trump as a major character throughout every episode. Trump is shown to have an abusive relationship with Satan, and his second administration was also parodied throughout the season.

The season was originally scheduled to debut on July 9, 2025; it was later delayed to July 23, with a new episode airing every two weeks. On September 17, the fifth episode was delayed a week. Parker and Stone stated, "Apparently when you do everything at the last minute sometimes you don't get it done. This one's on us. We didn't get it done in time".

It was announced on the day of what was expected to be episode six of the season that the season had actually ended with "Conflict of Interest." Instead, season 28 began with the episode aired on October 15.

== Episodes ==
No. overall	No. in season	Title	Directed by	Written by	Original release date	Prod. code	U.S. viewers (millions)
329	1	"Sermon on the 'Mount"	Trey Parker	Trey Parker	July 23, 2025	2701	0.43
When Eric Cartman's favorite radio station, NPR, is canceled by U.S. President Donald Trump, Cartman fears that "woke is dead", and attempts to kill himself and classmate Butters Stotch via carbon monoxide poisoning. Meanwhile, due to Trump's nationwide mandates to push Christianity, PC Principal starts calling himself Power Christian Principal and invites Jesus to a school assembly, to the protest of Randy Marsh and other parents. As a result of these protests, Trump sues the town of South Park, resulting in the town being required to pay $3.5 million and produce pro-Trump messaging.
330	2	"Got a Nut"	Trey Parker	Trey Parker	August 6, 2025	2702	0.84
After Mr. Mackey is fired due to federal budget cuts, he gets a job with the United States Immigration and Customs Enforcement (ICE), where he participates in the arrests of undocumented immigrants. Meanwhile, Clyde Donovan starts a right-wing debating podcast, which angers Cartman, who feels Clyde has "stolen his shtick". Cartman sets up his own successful podcast, but Clyde ultimately wins a Charlie Kirk Award for Young Masterdebaters over him, which includes a free vacation to Mar-a-Lago. Mackey's performance as an ICE agent earns him a meeting at Mar-a-Lago with Trump, who wants to help him with his expenses by giving him a promotion that will see Mackey as the face of the Department of Homeland Security. Mackey is horrified by the debauchery at Mar-a-Lago, and he and Clyde escape.
331	3	"Sickofancy"	Trey Parker	Trey Parker	August 20, 2025	2703	0.85
Randy Marsh's Mexican employees are arrested by ICE, causing Tegridy Farms to fall into bankruptcy. In order to save his business, Randy consults ChatGPT when rebranding Tegridy as "Techridy Farms". Trying to get funding from the government, Randy sends Towelie to a militarized Washington, D.C. to make a deal with President Donald Trump, who is getting gifts from various CEOs and leaders. Randy's message to Trump reveals Towelie is his gift to Trump, much to Towelie's horror. Realizing his plan has been a failure, Randy resolves to stop using ChatGPT and gives his phone to Sharon, who convinces him to sell the farm. It is revealed that Towelie is now used as Trump's personal semen rag, a fate from which Satan solemnly notes "There is no escape".
332	4	"Wok Is Dead"	Trey Parker	Trey Parker	September 3, 2025	2704	0.67
The girls at South Park Elementary have begun regularly fighting with each other over Labubu toys. One of the girls, Red, approaches Butters at recess and asks him for a rare Labubu for her birthday. He heads to an Asian pop-up store (formerly City Wok) to do so and is asked to pay increasingly high prices for the toys due to tariffs, causing price increases. Concurrently, Jesus investigates the Labubu toys and learns they are being used for demonic rituals. Butters manages to get the requested Labubu and goes to Red's birthday party, where she summons Donald Trump and Satan. Jesus arrives at the party and confronts Satan, causing Satan to confess that Trump has impregnated him, making him unable to leave the relationship.
333	5	"Conflict of Interest"	Trey Parker	Trey Parker	September 24, 2025	2705	0.55
The kids of South Park Elementary have become hooked on a prediction market app where they can win money by making bets. Kyle Broflovski is outraged when he discovers one of the bets is if his mom, Sheila, will bomb a Palestinian hospital in Gaza. Sheila learns about the bet and becomes increasingly outraged, causing the bet's value to rise. Eventually, Kyle manages to get the bet taken down after various phone calls. Meanwhile, Trump attempts to get rid of his and Satan's baby via various means. However, Brendan Carr ends up falling for all of Trump's attempted hits, gravely injuring him until he ends up at the hospital. At the same time, Sheila travels to Israel to scold Benjamin Netanyahu for giving Jews a negative reputation due to Israel's mass killing of Palestinians.

== Reception ==
The season heavily lampooned President Donald Trump, which was met with criticism from his administration. The season also featured a parody of United States Secretary of Homeland Security Kristi Noem and conservative commentator Charlie Kirk in the second episode, "Got a Nut". While Noem criticized her portrayal, Kirk reacted positively, calling it a "badge of honor". Following Kirk's assassination on September 10, 2025, the episode was pulled from reruns though is still available to view on streaming platforms.

== Home media ==
The twenty-seventh season, together with the twenty-eighth season, released together on October 20, 2026 in the United States.
