= Sermon on the 'Mount (South Park) =

- South Park episode
- Donald Trump in bed with Satan
- Episode no.: Season 27; Episode 1
- Directed by: Trey Parker
- Written by: Trey Parker
- Production code: 2701
- Original air date: July 23, 2025

Guest appearance
- Delilah Kujala as Amazon Alexa

Episode chronology
← Previous "South Park: The End of Obesity"	Next → "Got a Nut"
- South Park season 27

"Sermon on the 'Mount" is the first episode of the twenty-seventh season of the American animated comedy television series South Park. Premiering on July 23, 2025, it is the first traditional episode to be released in more than two years, and is the 329th episode of the series overall. The episode parodies the second presidency of Donald Trump, including legal actions taken by his administration, the Jeffrey Epstein files, and the administration's focus on Christianity. Creators Trey Parker and Matt Stone also used the episode to criticize Paramount Skydance and its predecessor Paramount Global, the "Mount" of the episode title, and the parent company of Comedy Central, which airs South Park.

The episode received the 2026 Primetime Emmy Award for Outstanding Animated Program.

== Plot ==
South Park fourth grader Eric Cartman is angry that U.S. President Donald Trump canceled his favorite radio station, NPR, and now fears that "woke is dead". At South Park Elementary, PC Principal, now calling himself Power Christian Principal, laments to Cartman's classmate, Stan Marsh, that his former woke outlook was "hopeless" and urges Stan to conform. A despondent Cartman attempts to kill himself and classmate Butters Stotch via carbon monoxide poisoning by running the Stotches' car in their garage with the door closed, not realizing that the car is electric.

Meanwhile, the school invites Jesus to a school assembly, as part of the push for more Christianity in the nation's schools by Trump, who says "he will sue anyone who doesn't agree with him." Feeling that this violates separation of church and state and angered by his other violations of the law, the citizens of South Park decide to contact him in protest. At the White House, Trump is seen animated in the same style as Saddam Hussein. (Note: As shown in the film South Park: Bigger, Longer, and Uncut.) He is also compared to Hussein by Satan, with whom Trump is revealed to be in a sexual relationship, and whom Trump beats and threatens with a lawsuit after Satan disparages his micropenis. Trump similarly threatens to sue the citizens of South Park for $5 billion after dismissing their complaints.

When the citizens hold a public protest, Jesus quietly informs them that his presence at the school is part of the settlement of a lawsuit with Paramount Global. Pointing to the cancellation of The Late Show with Stephen Colbert, which is owned by Paramount, Jesus urges the townsfolk not to run afoul of Trump's litigiousness and suffer a similar fate. South Park attorney Gerald Broflovski settles Trump's lawsuit, which requires the town to pay $3.5 million and produce pro-Trump messages, the first of which shows a deepfaked Trump wandering naked in a desert.

== Production ==
South Park co-creator Trey Parker stated that producers told his staff that they had to blur Trump's penis. They refused and put eyes on it to make it a "character", which would not need to be blurred. He said the conversation about this lasted for four days. During production, Parker was worried that people would not like it.

In addition to being reviewed by Paramount Global's standards and practices department, South Park executive producer Anne Garefino and Paramount COO Keyes Hill-Edgar asked Paramount's co-CEOs Chris McCarthy, George Cheeks, and Brian Robbins to review the episode, since it would likely upset the Trump administration. The co-CEOs approved the episode but wanted Parker and Stone to describe their review to Shari Redstone. Having not seen the episode, she trusted the co-CEOs' judgment and allowed it to be broadcast. David Ellison, who would become Paramount's CEO after their merger with Skydance Media closed, was told before the episode aired that it would be "disparaging" to Donald Trump.

The ending scene featuring Trump was originally presumed to be entirely deepfaked, primarily because Parker and Stone's artificial intelligence company Deep Voodoo was listed in the credits. Later, behind-the-scenes photos were released showing the scene being filmed, although multiple sources reported that deepfaking was used in the scene in order to make the actor playing Trump look more realistically like Trump.

== Release ==
"Sermon on the 'Mount" was first broadcast on July 23, 2025, on Comedy Central. The episode premiered less than a day after Stone and Parker signed a $1.5 billion deal with Paramount. In a thank you message to the CEO and COO of Paramount, Parker said that they are "focused on building something special and doing whatever it takes to bring championships to this city."

While 430,000 viewers watched the original airing on Comedy Central, the episode reached number one on Paramount+ as word spread about its content. Cross-platform, the episode's ratings were reportedly a record high since 1999.

== Reception ==
Stuart Heritage from The Guardian called the episode a "grand dare" from Parker and Stone for Trump to sue them. He added:

"Considering that South Park has always been known for its unvarnished satire, and for an extraordinarily responsive production process that allows it to comment on events almost until the moment of broadcast, the first episode of its 27th season always had the potential to sting. And since that first episode – entitled Sermon on the 'Mount – is a scorching critique of both Paramount's cowardice and Trump's eagerness to ride roughshod over his own voters, sting it does."

Rolling Stone writer Alan Sepinwall lauded the episode's scathing critique of the American president, writing "At precarious moments like this, certain things need to be said out loud, even if they're being packaged with juvenile dick jokes. When so many of their peers are too scared to offer even a mealy-mouthed version of criticism, Parker, Stone, and South Park just went for it."

Joe Rogan praised the episode on his podcast, "describing it as 'hilarious' and [called South Park] 'the greatest show of all time.'"

The episode received the 2026 Primetime Creative Arts Emmy Award for Outstanding Animated Program.

=== Trump administration response ===
The Trump administration was highly critical of the episode. An administration source reported to Deadline Hollywood that Trump was "seething over the childish attack by South Park". Taylor Rogers, the White House Assistant Press Secretary, issued a statement to Rolling Stone and USA Today in response to the episode:

"The Left's hypocrisy truly has no end — for years they have come after South Park for what they labeled as 'offense' [sic] content, but suddenly they are praising the show. Just like the creators of South Park, the Left has no authentic or original content, which is why their popularity continues to hit record lows. This show hasn't been relevant for over 20 years and is hanging on by a thread with uninspired ideas in a desperate attempt for attention. President Trump has delivered on more promises in just six months than any other president in our country's history — and no fourth-rate show can derail President Trump's hot streak."
