= Milky Subway: The Galactic Limited Express =

Japanese animated short series

- Key visual

銀河特急 ミルキー☆サブウェイ (Ginga Tokkyū: Mirukī Sabuwei)
- Created by: Yōhei Kameyama
- Original net animation

Milky Highway
- Directed by: Yōhei Kameyama
- Produced by: Yōhei Kameyama
- Written by: Yōhei Kameyama
- Music by: Kōhei Doi; Shunpei Ishiguro
- Released: February 28, 2022
- Runtime: 45 minutes
- Anime television series

Milky Subway
- Directed by: Yōhei Kameyama
- Written by: Yōhei Kameyama
- Music by: yuugen6 Kōhei Doi; Shunpei Ishiguro
- Studio: Shin-Ei Animation
- Original network: Tokyo MX; YouTube
- English network: YouTube
- Original run: July 3 – September 18, 2025
- Episodes: 12
- Anime film

Milky Subway: The Galactic Limited Express: Local Train to the Theater
- Directed by: Yōhei Kameyama
- Written by: Yōhei Kameyama
- Music by: yuugen6 Kōhei Doi; Shunpei Ishiguro
- Studio: Shin-Ei Animation
- Released: February 6, 2026
- Runtime: 46 minutes
- icon

Milky Subway: The Galactic Limited Express (Japanese: 銀河特急 ミルキー☆サブウェイ, Hepburn: Ginga Tokkyū: Mirukī Sabuwei; stylized as Milky☆Subway) is a Japanese animated short series directed, written, and self-produced by Yōhei Kameyama. It is a sequel to Milky Highway (ミルキー☆ハイウェイ, Mirukī Haiwei; stylized as Milky☆Highway), a 2022 original net animation also created by Kameyama. The series was released simultaneously on Tokyo MX and YouTube from July to September 2025. A theatrical edit of the series was released in February 2026.

== Premise ==
Arrested for violating space traffic laws, the genetically enhanced "super human" Chiharu and cyborg Makina are sentenced to perform community service alongside four other convicts aboard the Milky Subway, a train used for interplanetary travel. When the train is suddenly activated, the group must scramble together to resolve the situation.

== Characters ==
Chiharu Kujo (九条 千春, Kujō Chiharu; チハル Chiharu)
Voiced by: Mizuki Fumitsuki (short film), Momoka Terasawa (series) (Japanese); Anja Taljaard (English)
A 23-year old alien gyaru. She is cheerful and easygoing, but also careless and prone to being taken advantage of by others.
Makina Kurusu (来栖 真希奈, Kurusu Makina; マキナ Makina)
Voiced by: Kana Kobayashi (short film), Anna Nagase (series) (Japanese); Nancia Dorland (English)
A 23-year old cyborg gyaru who is childhood friends with Chiharu. She has a violent and impulsive temperament, which has resulted in multiple assault convictions.
Ryoko Kanzaki (勘崎 両子, Kanzaki Ryōko; リョーコ Ryōko)
Voiced by: Mikako Komatsu (Japanese); Bella Draper (English)
A human parole officer at the Ginkyo Prefecture Police Department.
Akane Daidoji (大道寺 朱音, Daidōji Akane; アカネ Akane)
Voiced by: Hisako Kanemoto (Japanese); Bella Draper (English)
The alien boss of a bōsōzoku motorcycle gang. She has a quiet but fierce personality, and is overprotective of her subordinate Kanata.
Kanata Iwao (岩男 鉄多, Iwao Kanata; カナタ Kanata)
Voiced by: Makoto Koichi (Japanese); Jada Dreyer (English)
A alien mechanic in Akane's gang. He is aggressive but physically lacking, suffering humiliating pratfalls as a result.
Kurt Cramer (カート・クレイマー, Kāto Kureimā)
Voiced by: Koki Uchiyama (Japanese); Conradie van Heerden (English)
A cyborg who works for a legally questionable protection service. He is impassive and has powerful mechanical arms suited for combat.
Max MacCallister (マックス・マカリスター, Makkusu Makarisutā)
Voiced by: Yoshitaka Yamaya (Japanese); Clayton Alexander (English)
Kurt's co-worker. He is upbeat and specializes in computer hacking.
O.T.A.M.
Voiced by: Yuri Fujiwara (Japanese); Nancia Dorland (English)
The Milky Subway's deprecated animatronic train attendant, whose artificial intelligence is linked to the train's mainframe computer.
Minami Minase (水無瀬 ミナミ, Minase Minami)
Voiced by: Haruka Sasaki (short film), Yukari Tamura (series)
A human idol singer who is beloved by Chiharu, Makina and Akane.

== Production ==
Milky Subway: The Galactic Limited Express is created by Yōhei Kameyama as sequel of Milky Highway (ミルキー☆ハイウェイ), an original net animation he produced as a graduation project and was first published in 2022. Much of the series' production is handled by Kameyama; he serves as director, writer, producer, character designer, modeler, animator, and editor. He used Blender to create the 3DCG, which he learned on his own.

On March 19, 2025, it was announced that Milky Subway: The Galactic Limited Express would be developed as a sequel series to Milky Highway. The series premiered on July 3, 2025, on Tokyo MX, with simultaneous streaming on YouTube, including dubs in English, Portuguese, Spanish, Korean, Chinese, Thai, Indonesian, French, Hindi and Russian. "Gingakei made Tonde Ike!" by Candies is used as the series' theme song. The final episode also features an insert song, "Tokimeki Meteostrike" (ときめき★メテオストライク, Tokimeki Meteosutoraiku), performed by Yukari Tamura in-character as Minami Miyase.

== Episodes ==
No.	Title	Original release date
1	"All Aboard!"; Transliteration: "Shuppatsu Shinkō" (Japanese: 出発進行)	July 3, 2025
Chiharu Kujo is interrogated by police officer Ryoko Kanzaki over an incident that has left Makina Kurusu in a disassembled state. Three days earlier, Ryoko supervises the recently arrested Chiharu, Makina, and four other local delinquents: the cyborgs Kurt Cramer and Max MacCallister, and the super humans Akane Daidoji and Kanata Iwao. Due to prison overcrowding, the six are sentenced to perform one week of community service cleaning the Milky Subway, an interstellar limited express train.
2	"False Departure"; Transliteration: "Gohasshin" (Japanese: 誤発進)	July 10, 2025
The six inmates are paired off to scrub the Milky Subway's carriages. In the back of the train, Chiharu and Makina discover a faulty control panel and a malfunctioning animatronic train attendant named O.T.A.M.; in one of the middle carriages, Akane and Kanata find a blood stain on the floor; and during a bathroom break, Kurt and Max discuss an urban legend in which several earlier inmates murdered each other aboard the train, which is believed to be cursed. Following a miscommunication from Makina, O.T.A.M. automatically activates the train, which takes off with the inmates on board.
3	"Chiharu and Makina"; Transliteration: "Chiharu to Makina" (Japanese: チハルとマキナ)	July 17, 2025
Fourteen hours before the Milky Subway's accidental departure, Chiharu and Makina are held at a detention center, blaming each other for their arrest. Ryoko analyzes the pair's criminal record, which includes multiple accounts of Makina preemptively assaulting people for Chiharu's sake; she chastises Chiharu for enabling Makina's aggression, and cautions Makina to change her ways. Shortly after the subway's departure, a panicked Chiharu and Makina attempt to take control of the runaway train by retrieving a missing control key from the front carriage, immediately running into Akane and Kanata in the process.
4	"Eat, Fight, Repeat"; Transliteration: "Īto In, Faito Auto" (Japanese: イートイン・ファイトアウト)	July 24, 2025
Chiharu, Makina, Akane, and Kanata agree to travel together to the first carriage. While stopping for vending machine food in the dining car, Makina insults Akane and Kanata for their dubious backgrounds, and temporarily paralyzes Kanata with her taser when he becomes confrontational. Akane furiously attacks Makina, leading them to brawl until they realize they are both fans of the same idol singer upon noticing each other's matching accessories, which causes them to become friends.
5	"Haijo-kun"; Transliteration: "Haijo-kun" (Japanese: 排除くん)	July 31, 2025
The group encounters a security robot that mistakes them for intruders and paralyzes Kanata with its stun gun. They also meet Kurt and Max, who claim to know how to stop the robot but are uninterested in helping the group. After waiting fifty minutes for Kanata to regain consciousness, the group becomes irritated by the robot's incessant music playing and formulates a strategy to deal with the robot themselves, but Chiharu and Akane are paralyzed as soon as they make the attempt.
6	"Kurt and Max"; Transliteration: "Kāto to Makkusu" (Japanese: カートとマックス)	August 7, 2025
Thirty-five hours before the subway incident, Kurt and Max are detained for smuggling illegalized sugar, which they claim to have been a delivery as part of their protection service job. Ryoko tricks them into installing interrogation devices disguised as candy, which compel them to truthfully answer her questions against their will. In an attempt for the pair to escape, Max uses a hacking device to shut the interrogation window, but not before they are forced to confess that they quit their ordinary jobs due to the thankless work and prejudice they have suffered as cyborgs.
7	"Labor and Reward"; Transliteration: "Shigoto to Mikaeri" (Japanese: 仕事と見返り)	August 14, 2025
Makina begrudgingly requests Kurt and Max's help against the security robot. The pair charge a heavy sum of 80 yen for their services, for which she pays an advance deposit of 40 yen. Within seconds, Max attaches his hacking device to the robot while Kurt bypasses its barrage of stun darts to activate the device, disabling the robot. Surprised when Chiharu earnestly thanks them for their help, Kurt and Max decline further payment and decide to join the group, though they refuse to refund Makina's initial payment.
8	"Tempura Shrimp Tail"; Transliteration: "Ebiten no Shippo" (Japanese: 海老天の尻尾)	August 21, 2025
The group takes a bathroom break when Makina's filter catches fire from blockage. In the women's room, Akane repairs the filter using mechanic skills she learned from Kanata. When asked about his other skills, she reluctantly admits he has none and that she simply allows him to accompany her, likening him to the tail of a tempura shrimp. In the men's room, Kanata confides that he is aware of his uselessness and questions why Akane keeps him around. Suddenly, the train switches to its emergency power supply and shuts the bathroom doors with both groups inside, closing on Chiharu's head as she stands in the doorway.
9	"Delusion and Panic"; Transliteration: "Mōsō to Panikku" (Japanese: 妄想とパニック)	August 28, 2025
After Makina and Akane fail to release her from the bathroom doors, Chiharu expresses vague concern that Kurt and Max will take advantage of Kanata. Assuming the worst, Akane frantically attempts to pry through the doors again to rescue him. Meanwhile, Max finds an exhaust duct in the ceiling with access to cables leading to the train's mainframe computer. Kanata agrees to rewire the cables to perform a system reset, as he is the only one small enough to fit in the duct. As the cyborgs hold Kanata up, Kurt's shoulder battery begins running low on power, which threatens to ruin the procedure.
10	"Akane and Kanata"; Transliteration: "Akane to Kanata" (Japanese: アカネとカナタ)	September 4, 2025
Forty-nine hours before the subway incident, Ryoko holds Kanata accountable for his and Akane's arrest, since he had escalated a police encounter while the two were pulled over for speeding. Aboard the train, Kanata successfully opens the doors before Kurt's shoulder gives out, causing the three to fall on top of each other before Akane rushes inside and sees them in a compromising position. After they explain the misunderstanding and Kanata's role in freeing the group, Akane apologizes to Kanata for doubting him. Ryoko contacts the group via phone to inform them of the situation, but the connection is suddenly lost. Kurt and Max deduce this and the train's other malfunctions to be part of a deliberate attack conducted by O.T.A.M.; directly addressing the group, O.T.A.M. decides to reveal everything.
11	"The Mastermind"; Transliteration: "Kuromaku" (Japanese: 黒幕)	September 11, 2025
O.T.A.M. explains her perceived duty to kill delinquents who disrupt the efficiency of the Milky Subway, deeming them to be societal threats and having orchestrated the previous murder incident aboard the train. She permits Makina to use an escape pod with Chiharu, revealing Makina's father to be the founder of Titan Industry, the manufacturing company that created the train. Encouraged by Chiharu, Makina refuses to abandon the others and defiantly shoots O.T.A.M. in the head. In response, O.T.A.M. surrounds the train with hijacked police drones to personally kill Makina along with the group, who prepare to fight their way out.
12	"Death of Makina"; Transliteration: "Makina Shisu" (Japanese: マキナ死す)	September 18, 2025
The group rushes to the back carriage with the control key, using the hacked security robot to disable the police drones that break in. Makina is shot by one of the drones after inserting the key, but survives by installing a floppy disk with her consciousness into the control panel, which transforms the carriage into a mecha and allows her to destroy the rest of the train. In the present, Ryoko verifies Chiharu's account with the rest of the group while Makina stands outside the police station, still in a mecha body.

== Other media ==
=== Manga ===
On September 19, 2025, a comic adaption of the series with the same title by Don Kouya, in supervision by Yōhei Kameyama, began serialization in Shōnen Ace Plus.

=== Film ===
On September 18, 2025, it was announced that the series would receive a re-edit with additional content. The film, titled Ginga Tokkyū Milky Subway: Kakueki Teisha Gekijō Iki (銀河特急 ミルキー☆サブウェイ 各駅停車劇場行き; lit. "Milky Subway: The Galactic Limited Express: Local Train to the Theater"), was theatrically released in Japan via Bandai Namco Filmworks on February 6, 2026. On May 19, 2026, Netflix announced that it will stream the film version of the series beginning June 1.

== Reception ==
Kara Dennison of Otaku USA Magazine wrote positively about the series. On the setting, which she describes as "at once futuristic and retro", she noted that "We can believe that the characters have lived, worked, and commuted within this world for all their lives and consider it 'normal,'" adding that the use of "Gingakei made Tonde Ike!" as the theme song "brings some honest-to-goodness Showa era feel to this Reiwa-era production". She also praised the "natural feel" of the dialog, writing that the main characters "sound like real people, less beholden to the conventions of anime voice acting".

The film debuted at number 10 on Netflix's weekly ranking of non-English language films, garnering 900,000 views during the tracking period from June 1 to 7, 2026, in the countries where it was most popular in Japan and Taiwan.
