= Got a Nut =

- South Park episode
- Eric Cartman performing a parody of Charlie Kirk
- Episode no.: Season 27; Episode 2
- Directed by: Trey Parker
- Written by: Trey Parker
- Production code: 2702
- Original air date: August 6, 2025

Episode chronology
← Previous "Sermon on the 'Mount"	Next → "Sickofancy"
- South Park season 27

"Got a Nut" is the second episode of the twenty-seventh season of the American animated television series South Park and the 330th episode of the series overall. It premiered on August 6, 2025. The episode features Clyde Donovan and Eric Cartman becoming right-wing podcasters – the latter in a parody of Charlie Kirk – and Mr. Mackey becoming a United States Immigration and Customs Enforcement (ICE) officer, in a story that parodies the immigration policy of the second Trump administration. Kirk praised the episode, calling his portrayal through Cartman "hilarious".

The episode was pulled from air a month later on September 10, following Kirk's assassination the same day.

== Plot ==
When South Park Elementary counselor Mr. Mackey is fired due to federal budget cuts, he gets a job with the ICE, which sees him participating in the arrest of undocumented immigrants at various locations. These include a Dora the Explorer stage show where both audience members and the show's stars, who were dressed in costumes of Dora, Boots, Diego and Swiper, are arrested, as well as Latinos in Heaven. During these raids, Mackey's superior, Department of Homeland Security (DHS) Secretary Kristi Noem, is seen shooting non-aggressive dogs, rejuvenating her frequently deteriorating face with botox, and participating in photo-ops.

To pay his monthly expenses, Clyde Donovan starts a podcast, and offends many of his classmates by expressing right-wing, antisemitic, and misogynistic views. He also angers Eric Cartman, who feels that Clyde has "stolen his shtick". After Clyde does a live show at the school, Cartman beats him up and takes over his podcast. Cartman uses the podcast as a platform on which he engages in "masterdebating" with callers, but when Clyde wins the third annual Charlie Kirk Award for Young Masterdebaters, which includes a free vacation to Mar-a-Lago, Cartman is outraged once again.

Mackey's performance as an ICE agent earns him a bonus, but he learns from his banker that his monthly expenses have increased. He also learns that he has earned a meeting at Mar-a-Lago with President Donald Trump, who wants to help him with his expenses by giving him a promotion that will see Mackey replace Noem, whose appearance disturbs Trump, as the face of DHS. However, Mackey is horrified by the debauchery he sees at Mar-a-Lago, including Trump's nudity, the presence of Satan in Trump's bed, and an imprisoned Dora massaging an elderly guest. When Mackey encounters Clyde, who is also there as part of his free vacation, Mackey confesses that he is disillusioned at having taken a job doing something he does not believe in, simply to pay for his expenses, and resolves that he is, at heart, a school counselor. The two escape the resort along with Dora.

== Reception ==
According to initial ratings information, not counting the full cross-platform total, the episode drew 838,000 viewers for its first airing on Comedy Central. The episode received positive reviews in Slate, The Guardian, and The A.V. Club for continuing the satire of the Trump administration from the previous episode.

Prior to the release of the episode, a trailer drew from one of the scenes of a caravan of armed masked ICE officers speeding in the street. The Department of Homeland Security account on Twitter (@DHSgov) posted a screencap from the trailer while promoting a link to the ICE career site. The South Park account, in reference to Assistant Press Secretary Taylor Rogers' statement that "[South Park] hasn't been relevant in over 20 years" in response to the preceding episode "Sermon on the 'Mount", retweeted the quote "Wait, so we ARE relevant? #eatabagofdicks". When reached for comment by Newsweek, a DHS spokesperson said, "We want to thank South Park for drawing attention to ICE law enforcement recruitment."

Responding to her depiction in the episode, Noem condemned South Park on the Glenn Beck Radio Program, saying, "It's so lazy to just constantly make fun of women for how they look. It's only the liberals and the extremists who do that", and added: "If they wanted to criticize my job, go ahead and do that, but clearly they can't." Noem also called the episode "petty", but said she had not watched it. Entertainment Weekly noted that Noem did not criticize the portrayal of her as a shooter of dogs, a reference to her admission to killing a pet dog.

Prior to the episode's release, Kirk expressed appreciation for South Park and its parody of him. Regarding the aforementioned promotional trailer, Kirk stated, "my first reaction is that I kinda laughed. ... We as conservatives should be able to take a joke, we shouldn't take ourselves so seriously – that's something that the left has always done." He also changed the profile pictures of The Charlie Kirk Show's and his personal Instagram and TikTok accounts to Cartman's impersonation. After it aired, Kirk praised the episode in a TikTok video, calling it "hilarious", and encouraged people to watch it.

=== Withdrawal ===
Kirk was assassinated one month after the episode aired. Following this, and despite Kirk's endorsement of the parody, some fans of Kirk and other MAGA supporters accused it of being a contributing factor that led to his death. Comedy Central then withdrew the episode from syndication on cable, although the episode remains available for streaming on Paramount+. Andrew Kolvet, a producer for The Charlie Kirk Show, asked Comedy Central to reinstate the episode, affirming that Kirk enjoyed his parody and stating that Kirk "would want the episode back up".
