= Associated Press =

American not-for-profit news agency

- Type: Not-for-profit cooperative
- Industry: News media
- Founded: May 22, 1846; 180 years ago
- Headquarters: 200 Liberty Street, New York City, U.S.
- Area served: Worldwide
- Key people: Gracia Martore (chairperson); Daisy Veerasingham (president and chief executive officer)
- Products: Wire service
- Revenue: ▼US$510.135 million (2017)
- Net income: ▼US$-73.966 million (2017)
- Number of employees: 3,300
- Website: apnews.com; ap.org (corporate)

The Associated Press (AP) is an American not-for-profit news agency headquartered in New York City. Founded in 1846, it operates as a cooperative, unincorporated association, and produces news reports that are distributed to its members, major U.S. daily newspapers and radio and television broadcasters. Since the Pulitzer Prize was established in 1917, the AP has earned 60 of them, including 36 for photography. The AP distributes its widely used AP Stylebook, its AP polls tracking NCAA sports, and its election polls and results during U.S. elections. It sponsors the National Football League's annual awards.

In 2016, news collected by the AP was published and republished by more than 1,300 newspapers and broadcasters. The AP operates 235 news bureaus in 94 countries, and publishes in English, Spanish, and Arabic. It also operates the AP Radio Network, which provides twice hourly newscasts and daily sportscasts for broadcast and satellite radio and television stations. Many newspapers and broadcasters outside the United States are AP subscribers, paying a fee to use AP material without being contributing members of the cooperative. As part of their cooperative agreement with the AP, most member news organizations grant automatic permission for the AP to distribute their local news reports. As of 2025, the AP attracts more than 128 million monthly website visits, making it one of the top 10 news websites in the U.S.

== History ==
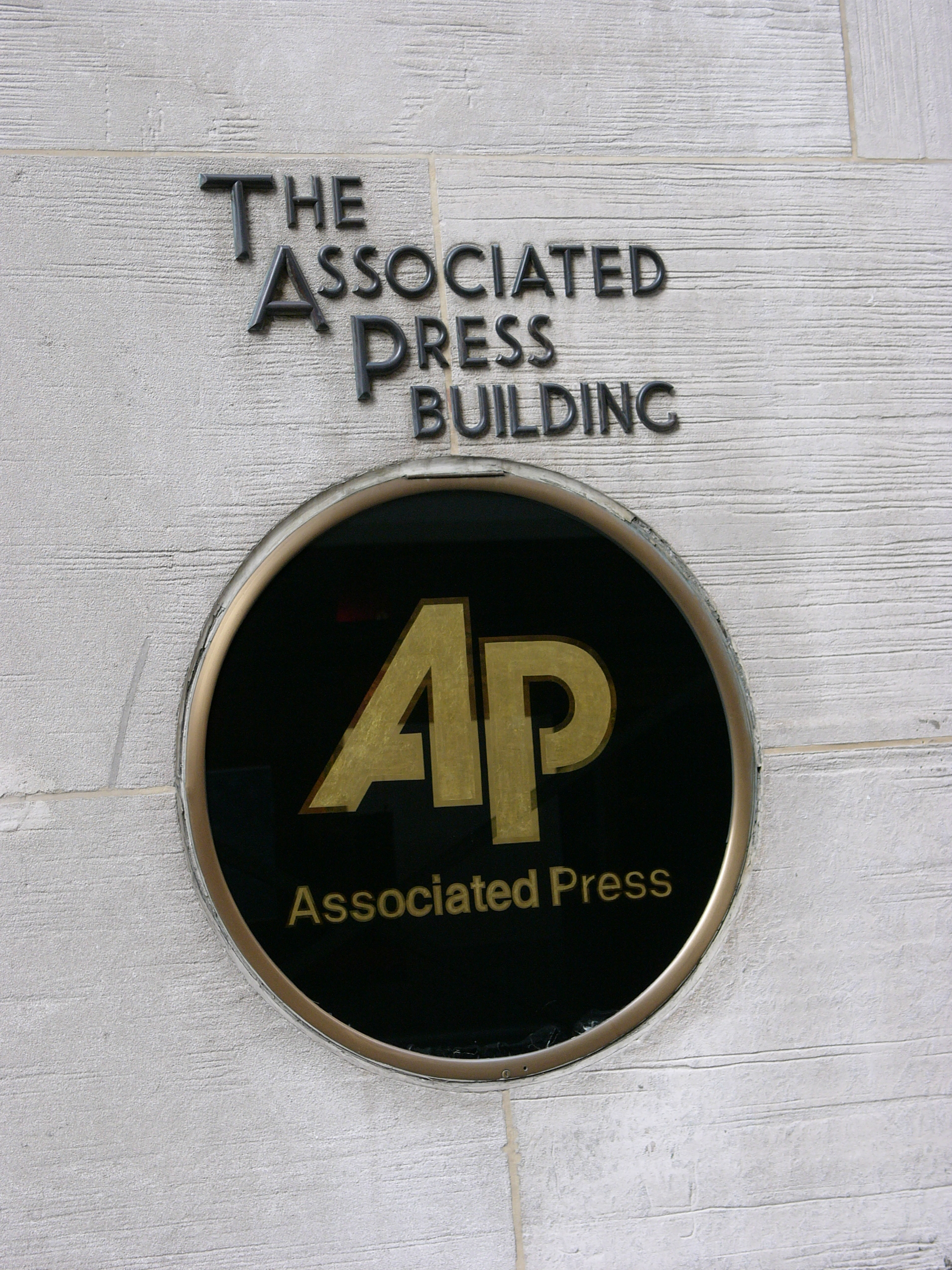
Logo on the former AP building in New York City

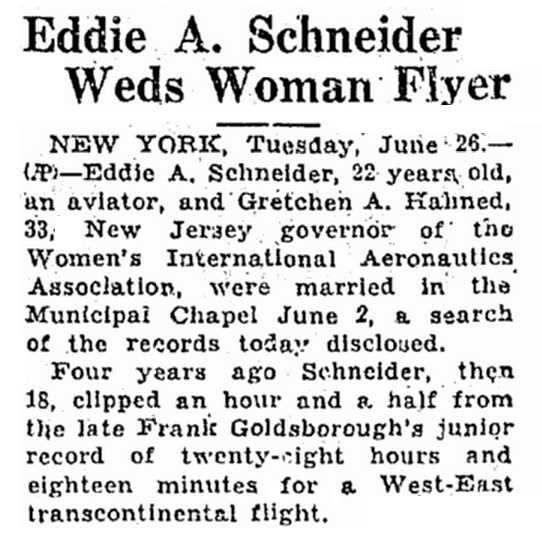
A bespoke AP ligature after the dateline of a 1934 newspaper article

The Associated Press was formed in May 1846 by five daily newspapers in New York City to share the cost of transmitting news of the Mexican–American War. The venture was organized by Moses Yale Beach (1800–68), second publisher of The Sun, joined by the New York Herald, the New York Courier and Enquirer, The Journal of Commerce, and the New York Evening Express. Some historians believe that the New-York Tribune joined at this time; documents show it was a member in 1849. The New York Times became a member in September 1851.

Initially known as the New York Associated Press (NYAP), the organization faced competition from the Western Associated Press (1862), which criticized its monopolistic news gathering and price setting practices. An investigation completed in 1892 by Victor Lawson, editor and publisher of the Chicago Daily News, revealed that several principals of the NYAP entered into a secret agreement with United Press, a rival organization, to share NYAP news and the profits of reselling it. The findings led to the dissolving of the NYAP. That December, the Western Associated Press was incorporated in Illinois as the Associated Press. A 1900 Illinois Supreme Court decision (Inter Ocean Publishing Co. v. Associated Press) holding that the AP was a public utility and operating in restraint of trade resulted in the AP's move from Chicago to New York City, where corporation laws were more favorable to cooperatives.

Chicago Daily News founder Melville Stone served as AP general manager from 1893 to 1921. The AP adopted teletype for its New York service in 1914. The cooperative grew rapidly under the leadership of Kent Cooper, who served from 1925 to 1948 and who built up bureau staff in South America, Europe and (after World War II), the Middle East. Under Kent Cooper, the AP became a more prevalent member of a press agency cartel made up of Reuters and Havas (now Agence France-Presse). He lobbied for the renegotiation of the tripartite contract binding the agencies and their respective news markets at the League of Nations in 1927, attempting to give the AP a more important place in competition with Reuters. The first female AP member, Zell Hart Deming, joined the AP in 1928.

In 1935, the AP launched the Wirephoto network, which allowed transmission of news photographs over leased private telephone lines on the day they were taken. This gave the AP a major advantage over other news media outlets. While the first network was only between New York, Chicago, and San Francisco, eventually the AP had its network across the whole United States.

In 1945, the Supreme Court of the United States held in Associated Press v. United States that the AP had been violating the Sherman Antitrust Act by prohibiting member newspapers from selling or providing news to nonmember organizations as well as making it very difficult for nonmember newspapers to join the AP.

The AP entered the broadcast field in 1941 when it began distributing news to radio stations; it created its own radio network in 1974. In 1994, it established APTV, a global video newsgathering agency. APTV merged with Worldwide Television News in 1998 to form APTN, which provides video to international broadcasters and websites. In 2004, the AP moved its headquarters from its long-time home at 50 Rockefeller Plaza to 450 West 33rd Street in Manhattan. In 2019, AP had more than 240 bureaus globally. Its mission has not changed since its founding, but digital technology has made the distribution of the AP news report an interactive endeavor between the AP and its hundreds of U.S. newspaper members, as well as broadcasters, international subscribers, and online customers.

The AP began diversifying its news gathering capabilities. By 2007, the AP was generating about 30% of its revenue from United States newspapers; by 2024, this had declined to 10%. In 2007, 37% came from the global broadcast customers, 15% from online ventures and 18% came from international newspapers and from photography.

In March 2024, Gannett, the largest U.S. newspaper publisher as measured by total daily circulation, announced that effective March 25, 2024, it would no longer use content from the AP. A spokesperson for AP said that they were "shocked and disappointed" by this development. Newspaper chain McClatchy announced that it would also stop using some AP services. Gannett and McClatchy will both continue to use AP's election results data.

The AP announced a restructuring in April 2026 that shifted resources away from hyper-local print coverage toward video, visual journalism and national topics. In May, the AP laid off 20 U.S.-based journalists as part of the restructuring.

=== Web resources ===
The AP's multi-topic structure has resulted in web portals such as Yahoo! and MSN posting its articles, often relying on the AP as their first source for news coverage of breaking news items. Frequent updates to developing stories have influenced the AP's public image and its role in providing coverage across a range of subjects. In 2007, Google announced that it was paying to receive AP content, to be displayed in Google News, interrupted from late 2009 to mid-2010 due to a licensing dispute.

A 2017 study by NewsWhip revealed that AP content was more engaged with on Facebook than content from any individual English-language publisher.

=== Nonprofit ===
In June 2024, Axios reported that the AP would be launching a 501(c)(3) nonprofit organization with the goal of expanding state and local news, hoping to raise at least $100 million in philanthropic funds to address the "crisis in local news."

=== Timeline ===
- 1849: The Harbor News Association opened the first news bureau outside the United States in Halifax, Nova Scotia, to meet ships sailing from Europe before they reached dock in New York.
- 1876: Mark Kellogg, a stringer, was the first AP news correspondent to be killed while reporting the news, at the Battle of the Little Bighorn.
- 1893: Melville E. Stone became the general manager of the reorganized the AP, a post he held until 1921. Under his leadership, the AP grew to be one of the world's most prominent news agencies.
- 1899: The AP used Guglielmo Marconi's wireless telegraph to cover the America's Cup yacht race off Sandy Hook, New Jersey, the first news test of the new technology.
- 1914: The AP introduced the teleprinter, which transmitted directly to printers over telegraph wires. Eventually a worldwide network of 60-word-per-minute teleprinter machines is built.
- 1935: The AP initiated WirePhoto, the world's first wire service for photographs. The first photograph to transfer over the network depicted an airplane crash in Morehouse, New York, on New Year's Day, 1935.
- 1938: The AP expanded new offices at 50 Rockefeller Plaza (known as "50 Rock") under an agreement made as part of the construction of Rockefeller Center in New York City. The building would remain its headquarters for 66 years.
- 1941: The AP expanded from print to radio broadcast news.
- 1941: Wide World News Photo Service purchased from The New York Times.
- 1943: The AP sends Ruth Cowan Nash to cover the deployment of the Women's Army Auxiliary Corps to Algeria. Nash is the first American woman war correspondent.
- 1945: AP war correspondent Joseph Morton was executed along with nine OSS men and four British SOE agents by the Germans at Mauthausen concentration camp. Morton was the only Allied correspondent to be executed by the Axis during World War II. That same year, AP Paris bureau chief Edward Kennedy defied an Allied headquarters news blackout to report Nazi Germany's surrender, touching off a bitter episode that led to his eventual dismissal by the AP. Kennedy maintains that he reported only what German radio already had broadcast.
- 1951: AP Prague bureau chief William N. Oatis was convicted of espionage by the Communist government of Czechoslovakia. He was released in 1953 after his sentence was reduced by 10 years.
- 1974: The AP launches the Associated Press Radio Network headquartered in Washington, D.C.
- 1987: The AP switches to color photography completely after the public suicide of American politician R. Budd Dwyer.
- 1994: The AP launches APTV, a global video news gathering agency, headquartered in London.
- 2004: The AP moves its headquarters from 50 Rock to 450 West 33rd Street, New York City.
- 2006: The AP joins YouTube.
- 2008: The AP launched AP Mobile (initially known as the AP Mobile News Network), a multimedia news portal that gives users news they can choose and provides anytime access to international, national and local news. The AP was the first to debut a dedicated iPhone application in June 2008 on stage at Apple's WWDC event. The app offered AP's own worldwide coverage of breaking news, sports, entertainment, politics and business as well as content from more than 1,000 AP members and third-party sources.
- 2010: AP earnings fall 65% from 2008 to just $8.8 million. The AP also announced that it would have posted a loss of $4.4 million had it not liquidated its German-language news service for $13.2 million.
- 2011: AP revenue dropped $14.7 million in 2010. 2010 revenue totaled $631 million, a decline of 7% from the previous year. The AP rolled out price cuts designed to help newspapers and broadcasters cope with declining revenue.
- 2012: The AP opens its Pyongyang bureau.
- 2012: Gary B. Pruitt succeeded Tom Curley to become president and CEO. Pruitt is the 13th leader of the AP in its 166-year history.
- 2016: The AP reported that income dropped to $1.6 million from $183.6 million in 2015. The 2015 profit figure was bolstered by a one-time, $165 million tax benefit.
- 2017: The AP moved its headquarters to 200 Liberty Street, New York City.
- 2018: The AP unveiled AP Votecast to replace exit polls for the 2018 US midterm elections.
- 2023: The AP reached an agreement with OpenAI to license part of its text archive and share technology expertise.
- 2025: Google announced an agreement for the AP to provide real-time news information to its Gemini chatbot.
- 2026: The AP agreed to provide its U.S. election results data to OpenAI through the 2028 general election.

== Governance ==
The AP is governed by an elected board of directors. Since 2022, the board's chairperson is Gracia C. Martore, former president and CEO of Tegna, Inc.

== Conditions of reporting ==
AP reports from countries where press freedom is restricted, sometimes under adverse circumstances, and operates out of more than 100 regional offices.

=== United States First Amendment lawsuit ===
In 2025, restrictions preventing AP reporting in the U.S. were imposed by the second Trump administration. In February 2025, two AP reporters were barred from covering several events at the White House, because of the AP's refusal to refer to the Gulf of Mexico as the "Gulf of America", as directed by the White House. The restrictions against AP were extended to other reporting opportunities such as in Air Force One. On February 21, 2025, the AP sued the Trump administration in Associated Press v. Budowich for blocking their attendance.

On February 24, 2025, a federal judge declined to issue an immediate order compelling the White House to reinstate access to presidential events to AP, although he encouraged the White House to do so. Following the decision, the White House released a statement asserting that "the ability to pose questions to the President of the United States in the Oval Office and aboard Air Force One constitutes a privilege extended to journalists, rather than a legally enshrined right."

On April 8, 2025, Judge Trevor McFadden ruled that the White House must lift the access restrictions they placed on the AP while the AP v. Budowich lawsuit moves forward. On June 6, 2025, the United States Court of Appeals for the District of Columbia Circuit imposed a stay upon the lower court's order, allowing the White House to resume barring access to some media events.

== Election polls ==
The AP is one of two organizations that collect and verify election results in every city and county across the United States, including races for the U.S. president, the Senate and House of Representatives, and governors as well as other statewide offices. Known for accuracy, the organization has collected and published presidential election data since 1848. Major news outlets rely on the polling data and results provided by the Associated Press before declaring a winner in major political races, particularly the presidential election.

In declaring the winners, the AP has historically relied on a network of local reporters with first-hand knowledge of assigned territories who also have long-standing relationships with county clerks as well as other local officials. Moreover, the AP monitors and gathers data from county websites and electronic feeds provided by states. The research team further verifies the results by considering demographics, number of absentee ballots, and other political issues that may have an effect on the final results. In 2018, the AP introduced a new system called AP VoteCast, which was developed together with NORC at the University of Chicago in order to further improve the reliability of its data and overcome biases of its legacy exit poll.

== Sports polls ==
The AP conducts polls for numerous college sports in the United States. The AP college football rankings were created in 1936, and began including the top 25 teams in 1989. Since 1969, the final poll of each season has been released after all bowl games have been played. The AP released its all-time Top 25 in 2016. As of 2017, 22 different programs had finished in the number one spot of the poll since its inception. In the pre-bowl game determination era, the AP poll was often used as the distinction for a national champion in football.

The AP college basketball poll has been used as a guide for which teams deserve national attention. The AP first began its poll of college basketball teams in 1949, and has since conducted over 1,100 polls. The college basketball poll started with 20 teams and was reduced to 10 during the 1960–61 college basketball season. It returned to 20 teams in 1968–69 and expanded to 25 beginning in 1989–90. The final poll for each season is released prior to the conclusion of the NCAA tournament, so all data includes regular season games only. In 2017, The AP released a list of the Top 100 teams of all time. The poll counted poll appearances (one point) and No. 1 rankings (two points) to rank each team.

== Sports awards ==
=== Baseball ===
The AP began its Major League Baseball Manager of the Year Award in 1959, for a manager in each league. From 1984 to 2000, the award was given to one manager in all of MLB. The winners were chosen by a national panel of AP baseball writers and radio men. The award was discontinued in 2001.

=== Basketball ===
Every year, the AP releases the names of the winners of its AP College Basketball Player of the Year and AP College Basketball Coach of the Year awards. It also honors a group of All-American players.

=== Football ===
- AP NFL Most Valuable Player
- AP NFL Offensive Player of the Year
- AP NFL Defensive Player of the Year
- AP NFL Offensive Rookie of the Year
- AP NFL Defensive Rookie of the Year
- AP NFL Coach of the Year
- AP NFL Comeback Player of the Year
- AP College Football Player of the Year

== Associated Press Television News ==
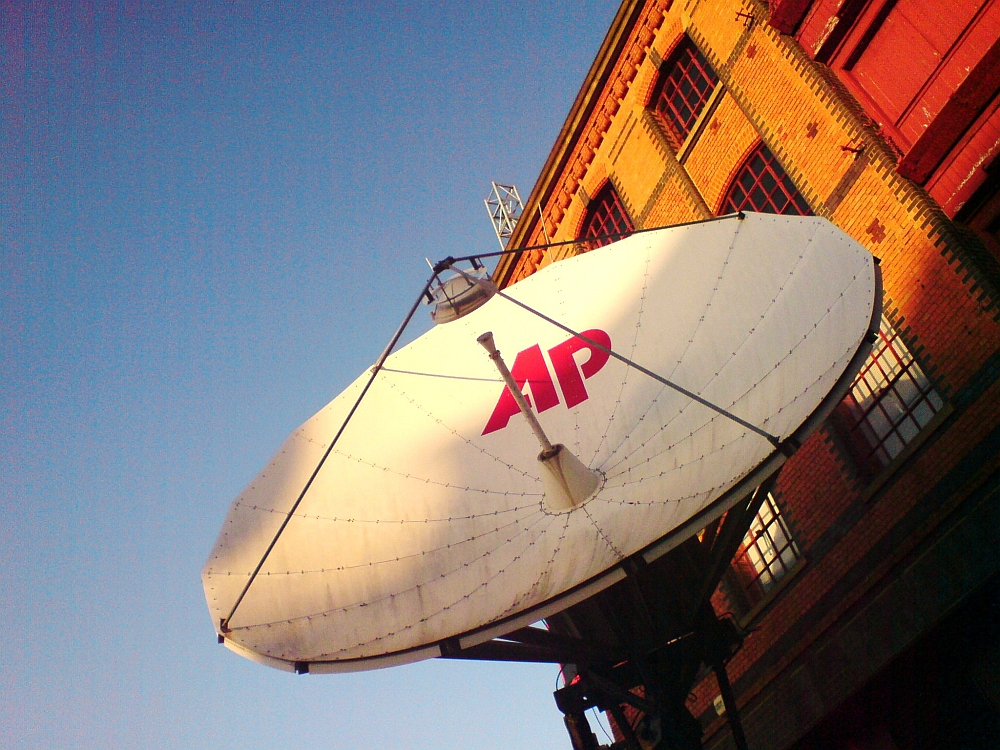
The APTN Building in London

In 1994, London-based Associated Press Television (APTV) was founded to provide agency news material to television broadcasters. In 1998, the AP purchased Worldwide Television News (WTN) from the ABC News division of The Walt Disney Company, Nine Network Australia and ITN London. The AP publishes 70,000 videos and 6,000 hours of live video per year, as of 2016. The agency also provides seven simultaneous live video channels, AP Direct for broadcasters, and six live channels on AP Live Choice for broadcasters and digital publishers. The AP was the first news agency to launch a live video news service in 2003.

== AP Stylebook ==
The Associated Press Stylebook (generally called the AP Stylebook), alternatively titled The Associated Press Stylebook and Briefing on Media Law, is a style and usage guide for American English grammar created by American journalists working for or connected with the Associated Press journalism cooperative based in New York City. The Stylebook offers a basic reference to American English grammar, punctuation, and principles of reporting, including many definitions and rules for usage as well as styles for capitalization, abbreviation, spelling, and numerals.

The first publicly available edition of the book was published in 1953. The first modern edition was published in August 1977 by Lorenz Press. Afterwards, various paperback editions were published by different publishers, including, among others, Turtleback Books, Penguin's Laurel Press, Pearson's Addison-Wesley, and Hachette's Perseus Books and Basic Books. Recent editions are released in several formats, including paperback and flat-lying spiral-bound editions, as well as a digital e-book edition and an online subscription version. Additionally, the AP Stylebook also provides English grammar recommendations through social media, including X, Facebook, Pinterest, and Instagram.

From 1977 to 2005, more than two million copies of the AP Stylebook were sold worldwide, with that number climbing to 2.5 million by 2011. Writers in broadcasting, news, magazine publishing, marketing departments, and public relations firms traditionally adopt and apply AP grammar and punctuation styles.

== Litigation and controversies ==
=== AP collaboration with Nazi Germany ===
The AP collaborated with Nazi Germany and gave it access to its photographic archives for its antisemitic Nazi propaganda. AP also cooperated with the Nazi regime through censorship.

In 2017, the German historian Norman Domeier of the University of Vienna brought to wider attention the deal between the AP and the Nazi government related to the interchange of press photos during the period in which the United States was at war with Nazi Germany. This relationship involved the Bureau Laux, run by the Waffen-SS photographer Helmut Laux.

The mechanism for this interchange involved a courier flying to Lisbon and back each day transporting photos from and for Nazi Germany's wartime enemy, the United States, via diplomatic pouch. The transactions were initially conducted at the AP bureau under Luiz Lupi in Lisbon, and from 1944, when the exchange via Lisbon took too long, also at the AP bureau in Stockholm under Eddie Shanke. Here, as a cover, the Swedish agency Pressens Bild was involved as an intermediary. An estimated 40,000 photos were exchanged between the enemies in this way. The AP was kicked out of Nazi Germany when the United States entered World War II in December 1941.

=== Israeli–Palestinian conflict ===
In his book Broken Spring: An American-Israeli Reporter's Close-up View of How Egyptians Lost Their Struggle for Freedom, former AP correspondent, Mark Lavie, who is an American-Israeli Orthodox Jew, claimed that the editorial line of the Cairo bureau was that the conflict was Israel's fault and the Arabs and Palestinians were blameless. Israeli journalist Matti Friedman accused the AP of killing a story he wrote about the "war of words", "between Israel and its critics in human rights organizations", in the aftermath of the 2008–2009 Gaza war.

==== Tuvia Grossman photograph ====
On September 29, 2000, the first day of the Second Intifada, the AP published a photograph of a badly-bloodied young man behind whom a police officer could be seen with a baton raised in a menacing fashion; a gas station with Hebrew lettering could also be seen in the background. The AP labelled it with the caption "An Israeli policeman and a Palestinian on the Temple Mount", and the picture and caption were subsequently published in several major American newspapers, including the New York Times. In reality, the injured man in the photograph was a Jewish yeshiva student from Chicago named Tuvia Grossman, and the police officer, a Druze named Gidon Tzefadi, was protecting Grossman from a Palestinian mob who had clubbed, stoned, and stabbed Grossman. There are also no gas stations with Hebrew lettering on the Temple Mount.

The episode is often cited by those who accuse the media of having an anti-Israel bias, and was the impetus for the founding of the pro-Israel group HonestReporting. After a letter from Grossman's father noted the error, the AP, the New York Times, and other papers published corrections; despite these corrections, the photograph continues to be used by critics of Israel as a symbol of Israeli aggression and violence.

==== Israeli airstrike on AP office building ====
During the 2021 Israel–Palestine crisis, the Israeli army destroyed the al-Jalaa Highrise, a building housing the AP's Gaza offices and Al Jazeera offices. Israel stated that the building housed Hamas military intelligence and had given advanced warning of the strike, and no civilians were harmed. AP CEO Gary Pruitt released a statement on May 16, stating that he "had no indication Hamas was in the building" and called on the Israeli government to provide the evidence. He said that "the world will know less about what is happening in Gaza because of what happened today."

On May 17, US secretary of state Antony Blinken said he had not seen any evidence that Hamas operated from the building housing the AP and Al Jazeera, but it is the job of others to handle intelligence matters. Israel reportedly shared intelligence with American officials and U.S. president Joe Biden showing Hamas offices inside the building.

Reporters Without Borders asked the International Criminal Court to investigate the bombing as a possible war crime.

On June 8, the Israeli ambassador to the US, Gilad Erdan, met with AP CEO Gary Pruitt and vice president for foreign news, Ian Phillips, to discuss the operation. In coordination with the IDF, Erdan said the site was used by Hamas intelligence officials to develop and carry out electronic warfare operations, and that IDF did not suspect the AP was aware of the alleged covert Hamas presence. After the meeting the AP stated "We have yet to receive evidence to support these claims". Erdan later tweeted "Israel is willing to assist AP in rebuilding its offices and operations in Gaza."

==== Removal of Israel-Palestine livestream ====
In May 2024, Israeli officials seized equipment broadcasting a live stream of Northern Gaza from the town of Sderot as part of a ban on Al Jazeera Media in Israel which had received footage from the broadcast. The move was condemned by multiple journalism organizations, Israeli opposition politicians, and US government officials. In a press briefing, the spokesperson for the National Security Council commented on the seizure, saying "The White House and the State Department immediately engaged with the government of Israel at high levels to express our serious concern and ask them to reverse this action." Later that day, Israeli Communication Minister Shlomo Karhi announced via Twitter that the equipment would be returned to the AP and the Israeli Government would review the positioning of the AP broadcast to determine if it posed a security risk.

=== Kidnapping of Tina Susman ===
In 1994, Tina Susman was on her fourth trip to Somalia, reporting for the AP. She was reporting on U.S. peacekeeping troops leaving the country. Somali rebels outnumbered her bodyguards in Mogadishu, dragged her from her car in broad daylight, and held her for 20 days. She told The Quill that she believes being a woman was an advantage in her experience there. The AP had requested news organizations including The New York Times, the Chicago Tribune, and The Washington Post to suppress the story to discourage the emboldening of the kidnappers.

=== Christopher Newton ===
In September 2002, Washington, D.C. bureau reporter Christopher Newton, an AP reporter since 1994, was fired after he was accused of fabricating sources since 2000, including at least 40 people and organizations. Prior to his firing, Newton had been focused on writing about federal law enforcement while based at the Justice Department. Some of the nonexistent agencies quoted in his stories included "Education Alliance", the "Institute for Crime and Punishment in Chicago", "Voice for the Disabled", and "People for Civil Rights".

=== FBI impersonation case ===
In 2007, an FBI agent working in Seattle impersonated an AP journalist and infected the computer of a 15-year-old suspect with malicious surveillance software. The incident sparked a strongly worded statement from the AP demanding that the bureau never impersonate a member of the news media again. In September 2016, the incident resulted in a report by the Justice Department, which the AP said "effectively condone[d] the FBI's impersonation". In December 2017, following a US court appearance, a judge ruled in favor of the AP in a lawsuit against the FBI for fraudulently impersonating a member of the news media in conjunction with the 2007 case.

=== Fair-use controversy ===
In June 2008, the AP sent numerous DMCA take-down demands and threatened legal action against several blogs. The AP contended that the internet blogs were violating the AP's copyright by linking to AP material and using headlines and short summaries in those links. Many bloggers and experts noted that the use of the AP news fell squarely under commonly accepted internet practices and within fair-use standards. Others noted and demonstrated that the AP routinely takes similar excerpts from other sources, often without attribution or licenses. The AP responded that it was defining standards regarding citations of AP news.

=== Shepard Fairey ===
In March 2009, the AP counter-sued artist Shepard Fairey over his famous image of Barack Obama, saying the uncredited, uncompensated use of an AP photo violated copyright laws and signaled a threat to journalism. Fairey had sued the AP the previous month over his artwork, titled "Obama Hope" and "Obama Progress", arguing that he did not violate copyright law because he dramatically changed the image. The artwork, based on an April 2006 picture taken for the AP by Mannie Garcia, was a popular image during the 2008 presidential election and now hangs in the National Portrait Gallery in Washington, D.C. According to the AP's lawsuit filed in federal court in Manhattan, Fairey knowingly "misappropriated The AP's rights in that image". The suit asked the court to award the AP profits made off the image and damages. Fairey said he looked forward to "upholding the free expression rights at stake here" and disproving the AP's accusations. In January 2011, the suit was settled with neither side declaring their position to be wrong but agreeing to share reproduction rights and profits from Fairey's work.

=== All Headline News ===
In January 2008, the AP sued competitor All Headline News (AHN) claiming that AHN allegedly infringed on its copyrights and a contentious "quasi-property" right to facts. The AP complaint asserted that AHN reporters had copied facts from AP news reports without permission and without paying a syndication fee. After AHN moved to dismiss all but the copyright claims set forth by the AP, a majority of the lawsuit was dismissed. The case has been dismissed and both parties settled.

=== Hoax tweet and flash crash ===
On April 23, 2013, hackers posted a tweet to AP's Twitter account about fictional attacks on the White House, falsely claiming that President Obama had been injured. The hoax caused a flash crash on the American stock markets, with the Dow Jones Industrial Average briefly falling by 143 points.

=== Justice Department subpoena of phone records ===
On May 13, 2013, the AP announced that telephone records for 20 of their reporters during a two-month period in 2012 had been subpoenaed by the U.S. Justice Department and described these acts as a "massive and unprecedented intrusion" into news-gathering operations. The AP reported that the Justice Department would not say why it sought the records, but sources stated that the United States Attorney for the District of Columbia's office was conducting a criminal investigation into a May 7, 2012 AP story about a CIA operation that prevented a terrorist plot to detonate an explosive device on a commercial flight. The DOJ did not direct subpoenas to the AP, instead going to their phone providers, including Verizon Wireless. U.S. Attorney General Eric Holder testified under oath in front of the House Judiciary Committee that he recused himself from the leak investigations to avoid any appearance of a conflict of interest. Holder said his Deputy Attorney General, James M. Cole, was in charge of the AP investigation and would have ordered the subpoenas.

=== Migrant boat NFT ===
On January 10, 2022, AP announced it would start selling non-fungible tokens (NFTs) of their photographs in partnership with a company named Xooa, with the proceeds being used to fund their operations. One of the NFTs they promoted on Twitter on 24 February was an aerial shot depicting an overcrowded migrant boat in the Mediterranean Sea by Brazilian photojournalist Felipe Dana. The sale received negative backlash from users and other journalists, with AP being accused of profiting off of human suffering and the picture choice being "dystopian" and "in extremely poor taste". The tweet was subsequently deleted and the NFT, which was to be sold the next day, was pulled from market. Global director of media relations Lauren Easton apologized, saying "This was a poor choice of imagery for an NFT. It has not and will not be put up for auction ... AP's NFT marketplace is a very early pilot program, and we are immediately reviewing our efforts". No further NFTs were announced or sold.

== Awards ==
The AP has earned 59 Pulitzer Prizes, including 36 for photography, since the award was established in 1917. In May 2020, Dar Yasin, Mukhtar Khan, and Channi Anand of the AP were honored with the 2020 Pulitzer Prize for Feature Photography. The choice caused controversy, because it was taken by some as questioning "India's legitimacy over Kashmir" as it had used the word "independence" in regard to revocation of Article 370.

The AP won an Oscar in 2024 for the documentary film 20 Days in Mariupol, a first-person account of the early days of Russia's invasion of Ukraine in 2022.

== See also ==
- Agence France-Presse, French news agency
- AP Stylebook
- Associated Press v. Budowich (2025)
- Associated Press v. Meltwater U.S. Holdings, Inc. (2013)
- Associated Press v. United States (1945)
- Australian Associated Press, Australian news agency
- The Canadian Press, Canadian news agency
- EFE, Spanish news agency
- George Emil Bria
- International News Service v. Associated Press (1918)
- International Press Telecommunications Council
- Jewish Telegraphic Agency, described as the "Associated Press of Jewish media"
- List of news agencies
- List of online image archives
- NewsML
- News Industry Text Format
- Reuters
- TweenTribune, children-focused news
