= Tina Susman =

American journalist and editor

- Education: San Diego State University-California State University
- Occupations: Journalist and editor
- Writing career
- Notable awards: Society of Professional Journalists, Newswomen's Club of New York's Front Page Awards (twice), National Association of Black Journalists (twice)

Tina Susman is an American journalist and editor. A senior editor at Time from 2019 to 2022, she was previously the national editor for BuzzFeed News and while at the Los Angeles Times had multiple roles, starting as Baghdad bureau chief and moving on to become a national correspondent based in New York. Prior to that she oversaw and contributed coverage from at least 15 countries in Africa for the Associated Press and Newsday, part of the over-five-fold trend in the increase of women war correspondents from 1970 to 1992. She left Time in 2022 and was a senior editor at the tech news site Protocol.com until its closure in December 2022. While reporting for the Associated Press in 1994, Susman was kidnapped in Somalia and held for 20 days. For this, she was featured in an episode of Oprah and on MSNBC among other outlets, and her case became the subject of debate about whether the Associated Press should have withheld news of the kidnapping.

== Early life and education ==
Tina Susman was born in Orange County, the daughter of Howard and Dorothy Olivia Susman, who had immigrated to the U.S. from England. They relocated to Oakland, California, where Susman attended public school. She told O, The Oprah Magazine, that her experience in that city and school system helped her learn how to "navigate threats." Susman earned a Bachelor of Science in Communication, Journalism, and Related Programs at San Diego State University-California State University. She was a reporter and an editor at the SDSU Daily Aztec.

== Career ==
Susman began working for the Associated Press out of college in San Diego; she moved onto their foreign desk in New York City and was sent to South Africa in October 1990. She was a Johannesburg-based correspondent until August 1993, covering the end of apartheid, the election of Nelson Mandela, and township violence, in addition to doing features, when she became the Associated Press news editor for the country, reporting and writing on top of doing managerial work. She covered the famine and civil war in Somalia, the genocide in Rwanda, and regional conflicts in Angola, Lesotho and Mozambique, among other places. She also happened to be in the Soviet Union when it collapsed in the fall of 1991 and wrote related stories.

=== Kidnapping in Somalia ===
In 1994, on her fourth trip to Somalia, and while reporting on U.S. peacekeeping troops leaving the country, Somali rebels outnumbered her bodyguards in Mogadishu, dragged her from her car in broad daylight, and held her for 20 days. She describes being treated "extraordinarily well" due to the kidnappers' interest in her ransom, and she told The Quill that she believes being a woman was an advantage in her experience there. However, the Associated Press had requested news organizations including The New York Times, the Chicago Tribune, and the Washington Post suppress the story to discourage the emboldening of the kidnappers. That year she subsequently moved to Abidjan, Cote d'Ivoire to become Associated Press' West and Central Africa news editor and correspondent.

=== Continued work in Africa and in conflict zones ===
Susman stayed at her job at the Associated Press, focusing on the wars in Liberia, Sierra Leone, Democratic Republic of Congo (then known as Zaire, the shift happened while she was there), and political upheavals in Nigeria, Cameroon, and elsewhere. One of her most famous stories from this time was a piece on General Butt Naked, a much-feared Liberian warlord whom she tracked down in 1997. The next year, she became the Africa correspondent for Newsday from Johannesburg, South Africa. In 1999, Susman won her first in a series of awards, first prize for international reporting from the New York Association of Black Journalists for her coverage of the civil war in Sierra Leone, including stories on a rebel attack on the capital, Freetown, and interviews with assault survivors. That same year, her child soldiers series from Africa received a Citation for Excellence from the Overseas Press Club. With fellow Newsday writer, Geoffrey Mohan, reporting from South America, she won Sigma Delta Chi for Foreign Correspondence from the Society of Professional Journalists for another series on the use of children as soldiers in Liberia and Sierra Leone, efforts to rehabilitate them, and challenges to their recovery. This work also garnered an award from the National Association of Black Journalists for "outstanding coverage of the black condition."

In 2000, Susman did a series of stories looking at the threats to Africa's environment, including deforestation in central and west Africa, the bushmeat trade in Congo, over-fishing in Africa's Lake Victoria; industrial pollution in South Africa, and efforts to save the great apes in Rwanda, Uganda and Tanzania won her an honorable mention, Overseas Press Club. In January 2001, she moved to New York City to be a Newsday national/international correspondent. That year, she moderated a panel on Africa in the city. She went to Pakistan in September and October of that year, to cover the situation there and in Afghanistan following the 9/11 attacks but was involved in a car crash while traveling in Kashmir and suffered two fractures in her right leg. She was a guest on The Oprah Winfrey Show on February 20, 2002 to talk about the accident, her kidnapping in Somalia, and the dangers that journalists face.

Susman's 2003 article on the rise donor activism has been used in law schools. In 2005, she took the first place prize from the Newswomen's Club of New York, for deadline reporting for her stories from southeast Asia following the December 2004 tsunami. She also reported on Hurricane Katrina that year. The next year, Susman won first place for in-depth reporting from the same organization for a series of stories on the conflict in the Darfur region of Sudan, including interviews with women who had been victims of rape by rebel forces, and witness accounts of attacks by the so-called janjaweed forces.

=== L.A. Times, BuzzFeed News, and Time ===
From 2007 Susman was the Baghdad bureau chief of the Los Angeles Times. From Iraq, she oversaw a team of US and Iraqi journalists as well as support staff and led the paper's coverage of the Iraq war. She told Editor & Publisher, "I think our paper does a better job of telling the story through the eyes of ordinary Iraqis. From what I do read, I actually think we do that on a regular basis more than others, maybe because of the staff we have. Part of, frankly, is because that's what I'm stronger at." Her article that year about Basam Ridha, Iraq's executioner, was called by Editor & Publisher editor Greg Mitchell as "important and balanced" in his book So Wrong for So Long: How the Press, the Pundits—and the President—Failed on Iraq. In addition to reporting, writing, and budgeting, Susman worked with security consultants in Iraq's capital to ensure her staff's safety.

In 2011 she was part of a team from the Los Angeles Times that won for coverage of the 2010 Haiti earthquake. She reached the country the morning after the quake, becoming one of the first print reporters on the ground to file from the scene. Her topics at the newspaper were breaking news, which ranged from the Westminster Kennel Club dog show to the Ferguson protests, the shooting death of Trayvon Martin and his killer's trial, the Occupy and Black Lives Matter movements, the legalization of same-sex marriage, and various natural and man-made disasters. Her co-coverage of the shooting deaths of African American men at the hands of law enforcement has been used by law scholars at Harvard, University of Virginia and Loyola Law Schools.

Susman became national editor for BuzzFeed News in 2016 overseeing the reporting of true crime stories and articles about the real effects of MeToo. She oversaw newsy pieces with an investigative edge focusing on policing, Title IX violations, and sexual misconduct in the workplace and in educational institutions. Two stories first reported by BuzzFeed News that Susman oversaw, resulting in the firing of their subjects, a respected UC Berkeley professor and a high-ranking DC Comics editor, for sexual misconduct. She also oversaw a 2018 article about a private school in California condemned for punishing their gay students.

In 2019 Susman became a senior editor at Time magazine.

== Awards ==
- Robert F. Kennedy journalism award (team), RFK Center for Justice and Human Rights, 2011
- First place, in-depth reporting for Darfur series, Newswomen's Club of New York, 2006
- First prize, deadline reporting, Newswomen's Club of New York, 2005
- Honorable Mention, Overseas Press Club, 2000
- Outstanding coverage of the black condition, National Association of Black Journalists, 2000
- With Geoffrey Mohan, Foreign Correspondence, Society of Professional Journalists (Sigma Delta Chi), 1999
- Citation for Excellence from the Overseas Press Club, 1999
- First prize, international reporting, New York Association of Black Journalists

== Family ==
Susman's mother Dorothy was English, whose father, Soterios Christou Terezopoulos, was Greek Cypriot and a barrister in London and a M.B.E. Dorothy, a pioneer in the repair side of the telephone industry, had a second daughter with Howard, Olivia Susman Dyas, who died in 1996.
