= Member of the Legislative Assembly =

Representative of voters to a regional or sometimes national legislature

A member of the Legislative Assembly (MLA) is a representative elected to sit in a legislative assembly. The term most commonly refers to members of the legislature of a federated state or an autonomous region, but is also used for several national legislatures.

== Australia ==
Members of the Legislative Assemblies of New South Wales, Queensland and Victoria, and the Houses of Assembly of South Australia and Tasmania use the suffix MP. Previously, these states used the suffixes MLA and MHA respectively.

Members of the Legislative Assemblies of Western Australia, Northern Territory, and Australian Capital Territory are known as MLAs. However, the suffix MP is also commonly used.

In the federal parliament, members of the House of Representatives are designated MP and not MHR.

== Brazil ==
In Brazil, members of all 26 legislative assemblies (Portuguese: assembléias legislativas) are called deputados estaduais (English: state deputies). Unlike the federal legislative body which is bicameral, Brazilian state legislatures are unicameral.

The Federal District legislative assembly is called the Legislative Chamber (Portuguese: Câmara Legislativa) and is composed of deputados distritais (English: district deputies). Members of the Lower House are also called deputies, but they are deputados federais (English: federal deputies).

== Canada ==
In Canada, members of the federal House of Commons of Canada are described as members of Parliament (MPs) and members of the Senate as senators, although both the House and Senate are part of the Parliament of Canada. Both senators and MPs are considered to be parliamentarians. Members of provincial and territorial legislative assemblies are called MLAs in all provinces and territories except:

- Ontario, where they have been called members of Provincial Parliament (MPPs) since 1938 (before then both "MPP" and "MLA" were used)
- Quebec, where in English they have been called members of the National Assembly (MNAs) since 1968
- Newfoundland and Labrador, where they are called members of the House of Assembly (MHAs).

This means that despite the fact that ten out of thirteen provinces and territories use the term "MLA", a large majority (62.8%) of Canadians refer to their provincial legislators as something other than "MLA" (due to Ontario's large population, slightly more people use the term "MPP" alone than use "MLA").

Despite styling its legislature as the House of Assembly like Newfoundland and Labrador, Nova Scotia describes its legislators as MLAs.

== Falkland Islands ==
Members of the Legislative Assembly of the Falkland Islands use the suffix MLA. In 2009 the Legislative Council of the Falkland Islands (which had existed since the 1840s) was replaced with the new Legislative Assembly. As a result, Members of the Legislative Assembly are often still referred to as Councillors.

== Hong Kong ==
Members of the Legislative Council of Hong Kong are referred to as Legco Councillors.

== India ==
Of the 28 states and 8 union territories (UTs) of India, all 28 states and three UTs (Delhi, Puducherry, and Jammu and Kashmir) have legislative assemblies.

A person, if qualified, may be elected as an MLA based on universal adult suffrage by an electorate consisting of all citizens above the age of 18 of that state or UT. Those elected or appointed to a Legislative Assembly (Vidhan Sabha) are referred to as Members of the Legislative Assembly or MLAs.

Each legislative constituency of the State or UT is represented by only one MLA. As outlined in the Constitution of India, the number of legislative seats in a legislature cannot be more than 500 members and fewer than 60 members. However, with an Act of Parliament, the seats can be fewer than 60, as such is the case in the states of Goa, Sikkim, Mizoram and the UT of Puducherry.

Depending on the population and other factors, each State or UT has varying numbers of MLAs, the highest being in the state of Uttar Pradesh (403) and the least in the UT of Puducherry (30).

Owing to parliamentary democracy, wherein some members of the legislature also act as the executive, some MLAs may have triple responsibilities: as an MLA, as a cabinet minister of a department and/or as a chief minister of that state.

== Malaysia ==
A state legislative assembly comprises elected representatives from single-member constituencies during state elections through the first-past-the-post system. The majority party in each assembly forms the state government, and the leader of the majority party becomes chief minister of the state. The state legislative assemblies are unicameral, unlike the bicameral Parliament of Malaysia. The hereditary rulers or governors are vested with powers to dissolve their respective state legislative assemblies on the advice of the chief minister. Once dissolved, elections must be carried out within an interim period of sixty (60) days. Usually, state elections are held simultaneously with the federal parliamentary elections, with the exception of Sarawak, and before 2004, Sabah.

== Northern Ireland ==
Members of the Northern Ireland Assembly, the devolved legislature of Northern Ireland are known as MLAs (Members of the Legislative Assembly).

The Assembly was suspended on October 14, 2002 but the persons elected to it at the 2003 Assembly Election were called together on 15 May 2006 under the Northern Ireland Act 2006 for the purpose of electing a First Minister and deputy First Minister and choosing the members of an Executive (before 25 November 2006) as a preliminary to the restoration of devolved government in Northern Ireland. Another election was held on 7 March 2007 and powers were restored to the Assembly in May 2007.

== South Korea ==
A member of any of the provincial legislative assemblies may be referred to as an MLA in English.

== United States ==
In the United States of America, state legislator is a generic term referring to a member of the legislative body of any of the country's 50 states.

The formal name of the legislature varies from state to state. In 24 states, it is simply called the Legislature or the State Legislature, while in 19 states, the legislature is called the General Assembly. In Massachusetts and New Hampshire, the legislature is called the General Court, while North Dakota and Oregon designate the legislature as the Legislative Assembly.

The Associated Press guidelines for journalists recommend referring to state legislators as state representatives or state senators to avoid confusion with their federal counterparts.

== Wales ==
Members of the Senedd, the devolved Parliament for Wales, are usually known as MSs or Aelodau o'r Senedd (ASau).
