= John Farndon =

British writer

John Farndon (born 1960) is a British writer of books, plays and music. He is best known as a writer of, and contributor to, science books for children.

== Biography ==
Farndon studied Earth sciences and English literature at Jesus College, Cambridge University. He is a Fellow of the Royal Literary Fund at Anglia Ruskin University (Cambridge).

Farndon was described by the Royal Literary Fund as "a writer of non-fiction books, and a playwright, lyricist, composer and literary translator. Spurred by intense intellectual curiosity, his interests range widely and he writes on topics from chemistry to China."

In 2014 the Daily Telegraph reviewed Farndon's book for 'would be' Oxbridge students, Do You Still Think You’re Clever?, where he explains how to tackle the toughest “unanswerable” question and win a university place.

According to the Royal Literary Fund, Farndon has been shortlisted a record four times for the junior Science Book prize.

Farndon was the Chairman of Eurasian Creative Guild.

== Publications ==
His titles include:

- How the Earth Works (1993), Dorling Kindersley (26 Aug. 1999) ISBN 978-0751308303. Shortlisted for the Rhone-Poulenc Prizes for Science Books - Junior Prize
- What Happens When? (1 November 1996), Scholastic Corporation, ISBN 978-0590847544. Shortlisted for the Rhone-Poulenc Prizes for Science Books - Junior Prize
- Pocket Encyclopedia, (1997), Dorling Kindersley
- The Kingfisher First Animal Encyclopedia (15 Sept 1998), Contributor, Published by Kingfisher Publications, ISBN 978-0753451359
- 1000 Things You Should Know About Geography, (1 Aug 2000), Miles Kelly Publishing
- Investigate: Human Body, (2000), Parragon Plus, ISBN 978-0752536606
- 4000 Things You Should Know, (27 May 2000), Miles Kelly Publishing, ISBN 978-1902947341
- Children's Encyclopedia, (3 July 2000), HarperCollins Children's Books
- 4000 More Things You Should Know, (10 Mar 2001), Miles Kelly Publishing, ISBN 978-1902947785
- The Complete Book of the Brain (18 May 2000), Hodder Wayland, ISBN 978-0750028547. Short listed for the 'Aventis Prizes for Science Books - Junior Prize'.
- Big Book of the Brain, (May 18, 2000), Hodder Wayland
- Science Experiment series; (2001; 2002; 2003), published by Benchmark Publications
  - Color;
  - Electricity;
  - Light and Optics;
  - Sound and Hearing;
  - Water;
  - Gravity,
  - Weight and Balance;
  - Flight; Awarded the 'Best Books for Children' & 'Editors' Choice' by American Association for the Advancement of Science - 'AAAS Science, Books and Films' (2002)
  - The Human Body; Awarded the 'Best Books for Children' by American Association for the Advancement of Science - 'AAAS Science, Books and Films' (2002)
  - Levers, Wheels, and Pulleys;
  - Magnetism;
  - Solids, Liquids, and Gases;
  - Chemicals;
  - Motion;
  - Rocks and Minerals;
  - Time;
  - Buoyancy
- The Big Book of Knowledge, (Jan 2002), co-authored with Angela Koo, Parragon, ISBN 978-0752592176
- 1000 Facts on Human Body, (2 Apr 2002), Miles Kelly Publishing, ISBN 978-1842360828
- 1000 Things You Should Know About World Geography (1 May 2005), Miles Kelly Publishing, ISBN 978-1842366349
- Space (2005)
- Bird Flu, Everything You Should Know, (2005) published by The Disinformation Company,
- Science Investigations: Electricity, (7 September 2006) Hodder Wayland. Shortlisted for Royal Society / Committee on Public Understanding of Science (CoPUS) Science Book prize.
- Do Not Open: An encyclopedia of the world's best-kept secrets (October 25, 2007) published by Dorling Kindersley
- Great Scientists: from Euclid to Stephen Hawking, (2007), ISBN 978-0760791974
- The Complete Guide to Minerals, Rocks and Fossils of the World, (1 Jun 2009), Co-author with Steve Parker, Lorenz Educational Press, ISBN 978-0754817369
- The World's Greatest Idea, (2010), Icon Books, ISBN 978-1848312456
- Do You Think You're Clever?: The Oxford and Cambridge Questions, (3 Jun 2010), Co-author with Libby Purves. Icon Books, ISBN 978-1848311329. Short-listed for the 'Society of Authors Education Award'.
- The Story of Science and Technology (A Journey Through History), (15 August 2010), Published by Rosen Publishing, ISBN 978-1448806218
- What do We Know About Stars and Galaxies, (1 Aug 2011), Raintree Publishing, SBN13 9781410941862
- Atlas of Oceans, on endangered life in the oceans. (2011) Published by Yale University Press in the USA, A & C Black in the UK, Australian Geographic in Australia. Listed by The Globe and Mail (Canada) as a 2011 top ten science book.
- Atlas of Oceans: An Ecological Survey of Underwater Life, (22 Feb 2011), Yale University Press, ISBN 978-0300167504
- Atlas of Oceans: A Fascinating Hidden World, (15 Mar 2011), Thomas Reed Publications, ISBN 978-1408131114
- Oil, (January 16, 2012), Dorling Kindersley,
- Discover the Extreme World (2012), Camilla de la Bedoyere, Clive Gifford, John Farndon, Steve Parker, Stewart Ross and Philip Steele, Miles Kelly Publishing, ISBN 978-1848109087. Sh* Atlas of Oceans, on endangered life in the oceans. Published by Yale University Press in the USA, A & C Black in the UK, Australian Geographic in Australia. Listed by The Globe and Mail (Canada) as a 2011 top ten science book. Shortlisted for the Blue Peter Book Award for the 'Best Book with Facts'.
- Super Bright Baby: 50 Things You Really Need to Know, (7 November 2013), Quercus, ISBN 978-1782061366
- Do You Still Think You're Clever?: The Oxford and Cambridge Questions, (6 Nov 2014), Icon Books, ISBN 978-1848316294
- Do You Still Think You're Clever?: Even More Oxford and Cambridge Questions!, (Feb 17, 2015) Icon Books, ISBN 1848319320
- The Illustrated Wildlife Encyclopedia: Bugs & Minibeasts: Beetles, Bugs, Butterflies, Moths, Insects, Spiders, (April 7, 2015) contributory author with Barbara Taylor and Jen Green
- Stuff You Need to Know, (30 July 2015), co-author with Rob Beattie, Firefly Books, ISBN 978-1770854949
- Project Body (1 Aug 2015), Miles Kelly Publishing Toy edition, ISBN 978-1782098225. Short listed for 2016 Royal Society's young people's prize.
- Stuff You Should Know, (15 Oct. 2015) QED Publishing, ISBN 978-1784932992
- The Illustrated Guide to Rocks & Minerals: How to Find, Identify and Collect the World’s Most Fascinating Specimens, (15 October 2015), Southwater; ISBN 978-1780190853
- So, You Think You're Clever? (10 May 2016), Icon Books, ISBN 978-1848319325
- The Omnipaedia: Learn Everything you Need to in a Year (1 Dec 2016), Square Peg Publishing, ISBN 978-0224095709

== Awards ==
=== Books ===
- Royal Society/Committee on Public Understanding of Science (CoPUS) - Science Book prize shortlist: How the Earth Works
- Royal Society/Committee on Public Understanding of Science (CoPUS) - Science Book prize shortlist: What Happens When
- Royal Society/Committee on Public Understanding of Science (CoPUS) - Science Book prize shortlist: Investigations: Electricity
- Royal Society/Committee on Public Understanding of Science (CoPUS) - Science Book prize shortlist: Big Book of the Brain
- Royal Society/Committee on Public Understanding of Science (CoPUS) - Science Book prize shortlist - 2016: Project Body

=== Plays ===
- Academia Rossica Russian translation prize shortlist: The Naked Guest plus Pushkin poems
