= Steve Parker (writer) =

British children's science writer

Steve Parker is a British science writer of children's and adult's books. He has written more than 300 titles and contributed to or edited another 150.

== Life ==
Born in Warrington, Lancashire, in 1952, Parker attended Strodes College, Egham and gained a BSc First Class Honours in Zoology at the University of Wales, Bangor. He worked as an exhibition scientist at the Natural History Museum, and as editor and managing editor at Dorling Kindersley Publishers, and commissioning editor at medical periodical GP, before becoming a freelance writer in the late 1980s. He is a Senior Scientific Fellow of the Zoological Society of London. Parker is based in Suffolk with his family.

== Publishing work ==
Parker's writing career began with 10 early titles in Dorling Kindersley's multi-award-winning Eyewitness series, from the late 1980s to the late 1990s. He has since worked for more than a dozen children's book publishers and been shortlisted for, among others, the Rhone-Poulenc Science Book Prize, Times Educational Information Book of the Year, and Blue Peter Book Award.

In 2009 he co-wrote The Complete Guide to Minerals, Rocks and Fossils of the World, with John Farndon, (Lorenz Educational Press)

In 2013 Parker's title Science Crazy (QED) won the UK School Library Association's Information Book Award, and Fizzing Physics (QED) won the Hampshire Information Book Award.

Parker also writes adult books, recently including Extinction: Not the End of the World? (Natural History Museum, 2013), the million-selling The Human Body Book (Second Edition, Dorling Kindersley, 2013) and Kill or Cure, an Illustrated History of Medicine (Dorling Kindersley, 2013.)

In 2014 Kill or Cure entered the New York Times Science Bestsellers and also won the 2014 British Medical Association Book Award for Public Understanding of Science.

In 2015 Parker was general editor of Evolution: The Whole Story (Thames and Hudson), heading a team of 12 expert authors in paleontology, paleobiology and paleoecology. Popular weekly New Scientist described the work as 'highly accessible … such an attractive and friendly book … the approach breathes life into everything, including "boring" stuff (that is, non-dinosaur stuff) … bright, breezy and modern'.

In 2016 Parker produced two of the largest and most complex titles of his career, Medicine: The Definitive Visual History (Dorling Kindersley), and BODY: The infographic book of us (Aurum Press) with graphic designer, illustrator and academic Andrew Baker. He also continued his collaboration with London's Natural History Museum with publication of Colour and Vision: Through the Eyes of Nature. 2017 saw further titles including A Brief Illustrated History of Life on Earth (Raintree) with specialist illustrator David West, and books on dinosaurs, oceans and seas, and robots and gadgets. In 2018 Parker received the School Library Information Book award for the second time, for In Focus: Seas and Oceans (Kingfisher).

== Educational work ==
Parker travels extensively around Britain to hold talks, workshops and book signings at schools, libraries and science events.

== Works ==
=== What If? series ===
- Space
- The Earth
- The Human Body
- Airplanes
- Sharks
- Giraffe
- The Crazy World of What If?
