= Pick Me Up =

Pick Me Up may refer to:

- Hair of the dog (that bit you), hangover remedy
- "Pick Me Up" (Masters of Horror), the eleventh episode of the first season of Masters of Horror
- Pick Me Up! (magazine), a British women's magazine
- Pick Me Up (album), an album by Brett Kissel, or the title song
- Pick Me Up (book), a book by Dorling Kindersley published in 2006
- "Pick Me Up", a manhua by author Hermod
- "Pick Me Up", a song by Emilia de Poret
- "Relax in the City"/"Pick Me Up", a song by Perfume
