= AP Stylebook =

Book on English usage by Associated Press

- AP Stylebook, 2024 edition
- Author: AP Editors (1909–1952); G. P. Winkler (1953–1970); Howard Angione (1977); Angione & E.A. Powell (1980); An., Pow. & C.W. French (1984); French (1986); French & Norm Goldstein (1988); Goldstein (1992–2007); AP Editors (since 2008)
- Original title: The Associate Press Rules Regulations and General Orders
- Language: English (online, ebook, and print editions); Spanish (online edition only)
- Series: Updated biennially
- Subject: Style guide
- Genre: Journalism reference
- Publisher: Lorenz Press
- Publication date: 1909 (1st internal ed.); 1953 (1st public ed.); 1977 (1st public modern ed.); 2020 (latest public modern ed.)
- Publication place: United States
- Pages: 640 (PB); 619 (SB)
- ISBN: 978-1-541647-57-2 (PB); 978-0-917360-69-5 (SB)
- Website: apstylebook.com

The Associated Press Stylebook (generally called the AP Stylebook), alternatively titled The Associated Press Stylebook and Briefing on Media Law, is a style and usage guide for American English grammar created by American journalists working for or connected with the Associated Press journalism cooperative based in New York City. The Stylebook offers a basic reference to American English grammar, punctuation, and principles of reporting, including many definitions and rules for usage as well as styles for capitalization, abbreviation, spelling, and numerals.

The first publicly available edition of the book was published in 1953. The first modern edition was published in August 1977 by Lorenz Press. Afterwards, various paperback editions were published by different publishers, including, among others, Turtleback Books, Penguin's Laurel Press, Pearson's Addison-Wesley, and Hachette's Perseus Books and Basic Books. Recent editions are released in several formats, including paperback and flat-lying spiral-bound editions, as well as a digital e-book edition and an online subscription version. Additionally, the AP Stylebook also provides English grammar recommendations through social media, including X, Facebook, Pinterest, and Instagram.

From 1977 to 2005, more than two million copies of the AP Stylebook were sold worldwide, with that number climbing to 2.5 million by 2011. Writers in broadcasting, news, magazine publishing, marketing departments, and public relations firms traditionally adopt and apply AP grammar and punctuation styles.

== Organization ==
The AP Stylebook is organized into sections:

Business Guidelines
A reference section for reporters covering business and financial news including general knowledge of accounting, bankruptcy, mergers, and international bureaus. For instance, it includes explanations of five different chapters of bankruptcy.

Sports Guidelines and Style
Includes terminology, statistics, organization rules and guidelines commonly referenced by sports reporters, such as the correct way to spell and use basketball terminology like half-court pass, field goal and goal-tending.

Guide to Punctuation
A specific guide on how to use punctuation in journalistic materials. This section includes rules regarding hyphens, commas, parentheses, and quotations.

Briefing on Media Law
An overview of legal issues and ethical expectations for those working in journalism, including the difference between slander and libel. Slander is spoken; libel is written.

Photo Captions
The simple formula of what to include when writing a photo caption, usually called a cutline in newspapers.

Editing Marks
A key with editing symbols to assist the journalist with the proofreading process.

Digital Security
A guide to protect journalists, their work, sources, online accounts, and avoid online harassment.

Bibliography
This provides second reference materials for information not included in the book. For example, it says to use Webster's New World College Dictionary as a reference after the AP Stylebook for spelling, style, usage and foreign geographic names.

== Title ==
From 1909, when the first company-wide stylebook-like guide was released internally under the title: "The Associate Press Rules Regulations and General Orders", and until 1953, the stylebook was published under different titles including, among others, Instructions for Correspondents of the Associated Press, The Associated Press. Regulations Traffic Department, A Guide for Filing Editors. The Associated Press, A Guide for Foreign Correspondents. The Associated Press, A Guide for Writers. The Associated Press, The AP Copy Book, and AP Writing Handbook.

By the end of WWII, pressures from a growing number of non-journalistic business sectors, already referencing copied or confiscated copies of the guide for years, greatly increased the stylebook's demand. The first publicly available edition of AP Stylebook was published in 1953 under the title "The Associated Press Style Book". Since 1953, the stylebook has been published under different titles, including Writing for The AP; AP Stylebook; and The Associated Press Stylebook and Libel Manual.

Some journalists have referred to The AP Stylebook as the 'journalist bible'.

In 2000, the guide was renamed The Associated Press Stylebook and Briefing on Media Law and the paperback edition has been published under this title since then. Some editions, such as the spiral-bound and e-book editions, use the shorter title The Associated Press Stylebook on their covers.

== History ==
The Associated Press organization was first created in 1846. The first company-wide AP "guide" did not cover English grammar. It was more of a brochure with 24 pages of various titles and corporate structures of the Associated Press organization and was first published in 1900 under the title "The Associated Press".

Although a formal English grammar style guide did not exist across the organization through the 1800s, individual bureaus were known to have maintained similar internal style guides as early as the late 1870s. The first corporate-wide style guide, with a complete reference to American English words and grammar, was released in 1909, under the title: "The Associate Press Rules Regulations and General Orders". (Note: The title page has a full title Hand Book and Manual of Resolutions of the Board of Directors/General Orders and Instructions to Employees of The Associated Press.)

By the early 1950s the publication was formalized into the AP Stylebook and became the leading professional English grammar reference by most member and non-member news bureaus throughout the world. Due to growing demand by non-member journalists and writers working in public-facing corporate communications, the AP published their first official "stylebook" for the general public in 1953 under the title Associated Press Style Book; the first publication focused on "where the wire set a specific style". For nearly a quarter century it assumed its reader had a "solid grounding in language and a good reference library" and thus omitted any guidelines in those broader areas. In 1977, prompted by AP Executive News Editor Lou Boccardi's request for "more of a reference work", the organization started expanding the book and in 1977 produced a book that was different in a few fundamental regards. Firstly, the structure was changed and entries were organized in alphabetical order so that users could find what they need in a timely manner. Secondly, in 1977 the book was published for the first time by a 3rd party publisher – Lorenz Press. Thirdly, in 1977, United Press International and AP cooperated to produce stylebooks for each organization based on revisions and guidelines jointly agreed to by editors of both UPI Stylebook (Bobby Ray Miller) and AP Stylebook (Howard Angione). In 1982, Eileen Alt Powell, a co-editor of AP Stylebook 1980 edition, stated that:

Howard Angione... at times thought the task he and UPI counterpart Bobby Ray Miller had undertaken resembled the quest of Don Quixote. It was "an impossible dream", Angione said, to find style rules that pleased everyone, especially since even grammarians couldn't agree among themselves.

In 1989, Norm Goldstein became the AP Stylebook lead editor, a job he held until the 2007 edition. After publishing the final edition under his editorship, Goldstein commented on the future of the AP Stylebook's section on name references:

I think the difference... now is that there is more information available on the Internet, and I'm not sure, and at least our executive editor is not sure, how much of a reference book we ought to be anymore. I think some of our historical background material like on previous hurricanes and earthquakes, that kind of encyclopedic material that's so easily available on the Internet now, might be cut back.

After Norm Goldstein stepped down as lead editor in 2007, in bibliographical records for all subsequent editions starting from 2008 lead editors' names are usually not explicitly called out and the author is simply referred to as Associated Press or AP Editors. In 2009 and 2011 the Stylebook was released as an app called AP Stylebook Mobile edition for iOS and BlackBerry, respectively, however it was later discontinued in 2015 in favor of users simply accessing the AP Stylebook online edition through their desktop or mobile browsers. In March 2019 AP created an Archived AP Stylebooks section on its apstylebook.com website where anyone can access previous versions of the AP Stylebook starting from 1900 "brochure on AP corporate structure" and all the way to 1977 edition.

The first Spanish AP stylebook was created in 2012, after requests from the AP Mexico City bureau and others to develop such a stylebook. The bureau at the time was looking for ways to expand into Latin America while bridging the language barrier. In 2013 the AP Spanish Stylebook came into fruition and is now available to everyone. The Spanish AP stylebook is also referred to as the Manual de Estilo.

The most recent print edition is the 2020–2022 AP Stylebook, available spiral-bound directly from AP, and as a perfect-bound paperback sold by Basic Books. Creation of AP Stylebook has been helmed by lead editor Paula Froke since 2016. In early 2023, the stylebook attracted attention for suggesting that "the French" could be an offensive term in a tweet promoting people-first language; there was considerable mockery of the suggestion, and the AP subsequently retracted it.

After American president Donald Trump issued Executive Order 14172 to rename the Gulf of Mexico as the 'Gulf of America', the Associated Press style recommended both names were to be used, as "Mexico, as well as other countries and international bodies, do not have to recognize the name change", and "the Gulf of Mexico has carried that name for more than 400 years. Following this, Associated Press journalists were prevented from covering several events in the White House, due to the news agency's use of the 'Gulf of Mexico' name. The White House then banned the Associated Press indefinitely from the Oval Office and Air Force One due to their reporting over the gulf's name.

== Influence on American English ==
The influence of the AP and similar news service styles has reached beyond the news writing community. Many other North American sectors disseminating information to the public began to adopt news styles as early as the late 1800s. Many other sectors now also have developed their own similar style guides and also continue to reference the AP Stylebook for general American grammar, more than any other style guide available.

== Edition ==
=== Edition number: English edition ===
The first publicly available English edition of the book was released in 1953. However, all editions prior to 1977 are not included in the editions count and the first modern edition is considered to be the August 1977 edition released for the first time by Lorenz Press. The latest, 2020 version, is the 55th edition and can be used until 2022. The Associated Press has reduced the frequency in print publication due to the popularity of the online version of the AP Stylebook. The print version is expected to be available, unless otherwise stated, biennially.

=== Edition number: Spanish edition ===
Due to the rising influence of the Spanish language worldwide, in November 2012 Associated Press added, in addition to American English, its first ever Spanish edition of its stylebook. The Spanish edition is separate from the English edition and has a different website, as well as Twitter and Facebook accounts. Unlike the English edition which currently has both online and print versions, the Spanish edition only has an online edition. The Spanish edition does not have an 'edition number' since it only exists as an online service.

== Revision process ==
From 1980 to 1984, the English edition was updated biennially; then from 1985 to 2020, the English edition was updated annually, usually in May, at which time edits and new entries were added to keep the stylebook up to date with technological and cultural changes. As of the middle of 2024, the most recent edition is the 2024–2026 edition (57th edition).

In 1979, the AP adopted the Pinyin romanization system for the names of most people and places in the People's Republic of China, although keeping the former Wade–Giles system for some well-known names, including the capital city of Peking. The spelling of "Peking" was subsequently changed to "Beijing" by the AP in 1987.

In 1986, the AP updated the spelling of the name of the ruler of Libya, Muammar Gaddafi, from its previous recommendation of "Khadafy" to "Gadhafi", after he sent a letter to a group of American schoolchildren which used that spelling beneath his Arabic signature.

In 1991, the Stylebook recommended the spelling "Muslim" instead of the previously standard "Moslem", making it the most common spelling in the United States thereafter.

In 2005, dozens of new or revised entries were added, including "Sept. 11", "e.g.", "i.e.", "FedEx", and "Midwest region".

In 2008, about 200 new or revised entries were added, including "iPhone", "anti-virus", "outsourcing", "podcast", "text messaging", "social networking", "high-definition", and "Wikipedia".

In 2009, about 60 new or revised entries were added, including "Twitter", "baba ghanoush", and "texting".

In 2013, about 90 new or revised entries were added, including "Benedictine", "Grand Marnier", "madeleine" and "upside-down cake", "chichi" and "froufrou". Journalistic usage of "illegal immigrant" was no longer sanctioned. The use of 'illegal' to describe a person became regulated. The decision was part of a wider AP move away from labeling people.

In 2018, AP Stylebook included a chapter on polling and surveys. Recommends the use of "birthing people" and "pregnant people", which was clarified in 2022.

In 2019, about 200 new or revised entries were added, including "budtender", "deepfake", and "cryptocurrency". AP Style recommended removal of the hyphen in Asian‑American, African-American, or Irish-American as common microaggression for more than a century.

The 2020–2022 edition was released on May 21, 2020. About 90 new or revised technology-related entries were added, including "internet privacy", "digital wallet" / "mobile wallet", "smart devices", and "lidar". A new chapter was added about digital security for journalists. AP stylebook moved to capitalized Black and lowercase white.

The 2022–2024 edition includes more than 300 new and revised entries, including a new chapter on "inclusive storytelling", "where possible" usage of "they/them/their" singular pronouns, revised guidance on the use of the term "female", immigration and new entries for "critical race theory", "anti‑vaxxer". A controversial change was referring to X as "X, formerly known as Twitter". Cautions use of the word "female" in the context of describing women, as some people object to emphasizing biology and reproductive capacity.

The 2024–2026 edition includes a new criminal justice chapter. The edition also marked a switch from Webster's New World College Dictionary to Merriam-Webster as the AP Stylebook's official dictionary.
