= Associated Press v. United States =

- Supreme Court of the United States

Argued December 5–6, 1944 Decided June 18, 1945
- Full case name: Associated Press v. United States; Tribune Company v. United States; United States v. Associated Press
- Citations: 326 U.S. 1 (more) 65 S. Ct. 1416; 89 L. Ed. 2013

Case history
- Prior: Appeal from the District Court of the United States for the Southern District of New York

Holding
- The Associated Press violated the Sherman Antitrust Act by prohibiting member newspapers from selling or providing any news to nonmember organizations as well as making it very difficult for nonmember newspapers to join the AP.

Court membership
- Chief Justice Harlan F. Stone Associate Justices Owen Roberts · Hugo Black; Stanley F. Reed · Felix Frankfurter; William O. Douglas · Frank Murphy; Robert H. Jackson · Wiley B. Rutledge

Case opinions
- Majority: Black, joined by Reed, Douglas, Rutledge (in full); Stone, Roberts, Frankfurter, Murphy (in parts)
- Concurrence: Douglas
- Concurrence: Frankfurter (in judgment)
- Concur/dissent: Roberts, joined by Stone
- Concur/dissent: Murphy
- Jackson took no part in the consideration or decision of the case.

Associated Press v. United States, 326 U.S. 1 (1945) was a ruling of the United States Supreme Court concerning both antitrust law and freedom of the press. The ruling confirmed that anticompetitive behavior in the news industry should be subjected to a First Amendment analysis on the ability of the public to receive information from multiple sources.

== Background ==
The Associated Press (AP), which included more than 1,200 American newspapers in its membership, had prohibited its members from selling or providing news content to organizations that were not members, regardless of whether that content had been created by the AP as branded content, or by its member newspapers in the form of "spontaneous news". This rule made it difficult for non-member news organizations to compete with or join the AP network.

A similar rule had been enacted by another news conglomerate, the Tribune Company, and the United States government sued both that company and the AP for violations of the Sherman Antitrust Act. Action against the AP was first heard at the District Court for the Southern District of New York, which held that the AP had violated antitrust law. The AP appealed, and the concurrent government action against the Tribune Company was combined into the Supreme Court proceeding under the name Associated Press v. United States in 1945.

== Opinion of the court ==
The Supreme Court, in a decision written by Justice Hugo Black, held that the Associated Press had violated the Sherman Antitrust Act. While the AP had argued that the First Amendment allowed it to control the distribution of its own content, the court disagreed, ruling that freedom of the press did not allow news organizations to violate antitrust law. The AP bylaws, as written, constituted restraint of trade. Furthermore, the bylaws restricted interstate commerce in a fashion prohibited by the Sherman Act. The fact that the AP had not yet achieved a true monopoly on the distribution of news content was deemed irrelevant,

While the ruling essentially focused on antitrust law, the parts of Black's opinion discussing journalism and public knowledge have become more influential. In Black's words: "Freedom to publish is guaranteed by the Constitution, but freedom to combine to keep others from publishing is not. Freedom of the press from governmental interference under the First Amendment does not sanction repression of that freedom by private interests."

== Impact ==
Associated Press v. United States, thanks to Black's comment on the control of private media interests, is widely cited as an important precedent supporting efforts in the United States to restrict media concentration. This applies to both the growth of news conglomerates in that era, and the later growth of mass media firms. The ruling has regained influence in the newspaper industry in the 2000s, this time due to the consolidation of newspaper ownership as that industry declines in profitability.

The ruling has also been cited as justification for many regulations by the Federal Communications Commission toward broadcasting content, as media firms may try to prevent certain viewpoints from being seen/heard on stations that they control. In the more recent era, Black's comments on the power of media conglomerates have been applied in arguments to regulate the size of big tech firms, who have pioneered new techniques for controlling the flow of information to the public.
