= Five Manhattan West =

Building in Manhattan, New York

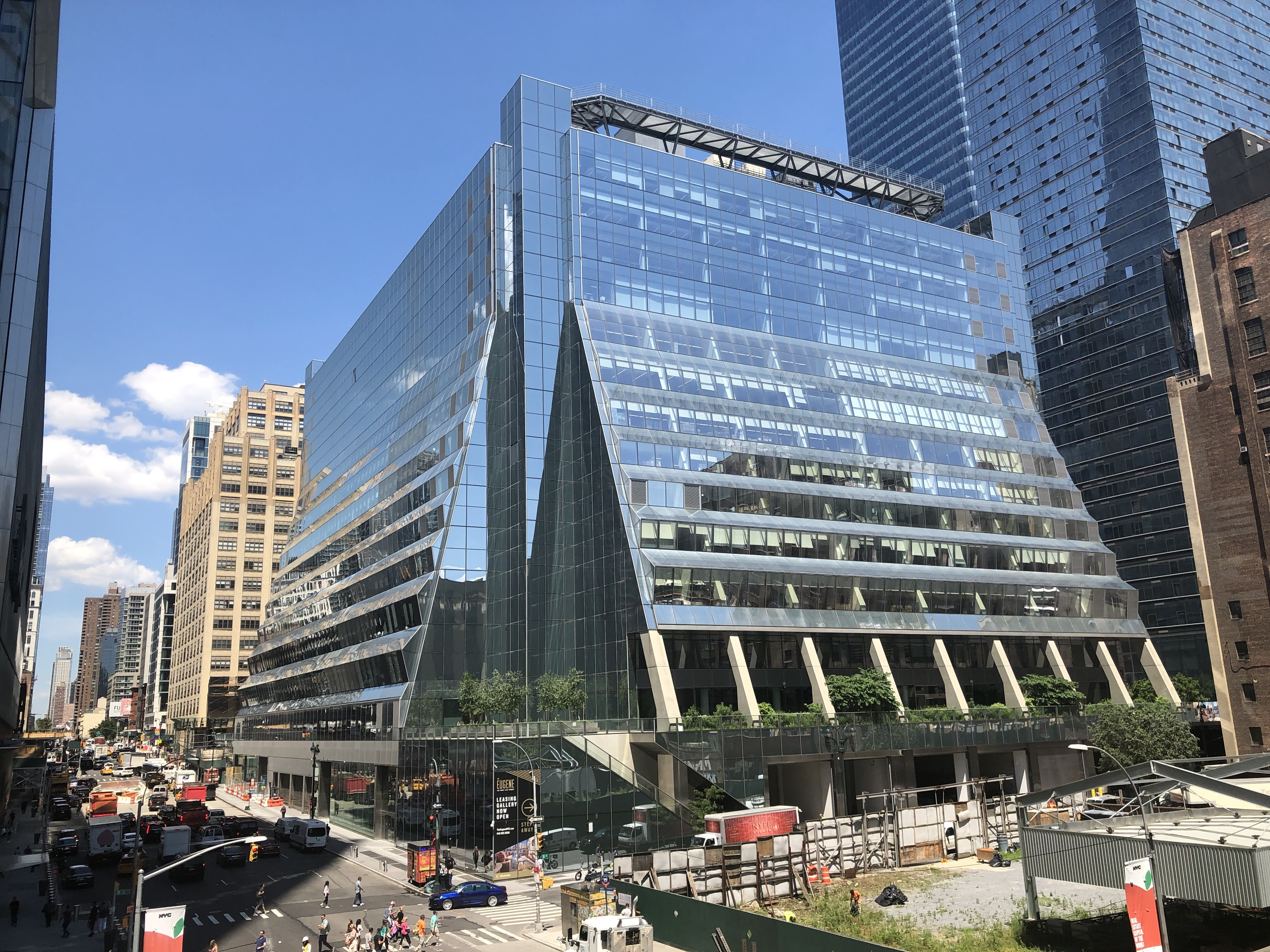
- 5 Manhattan West in 2019
- Interactive map of the Five Manhattan West area

General information
- Status: Completed
- Type: Office and Retail
- Location: 450 West 33rd Street
- Coordinates: 40°45′11″N 73°59′58″W
- Completed: 1969; 57 years ago

Technical details
- Floor area: 1,800,000 square feet (170,000 m^{2})

Design and construction
- Architect: Davis Brody Bond
- Developer: Brookfield Properties; Qatar Investment Authority
- Engineer: Cosentini Associates
- Structural engineer: Robert Rosenwasser Consulting Engineers
- Main contractor: AECOM Tishman Construction

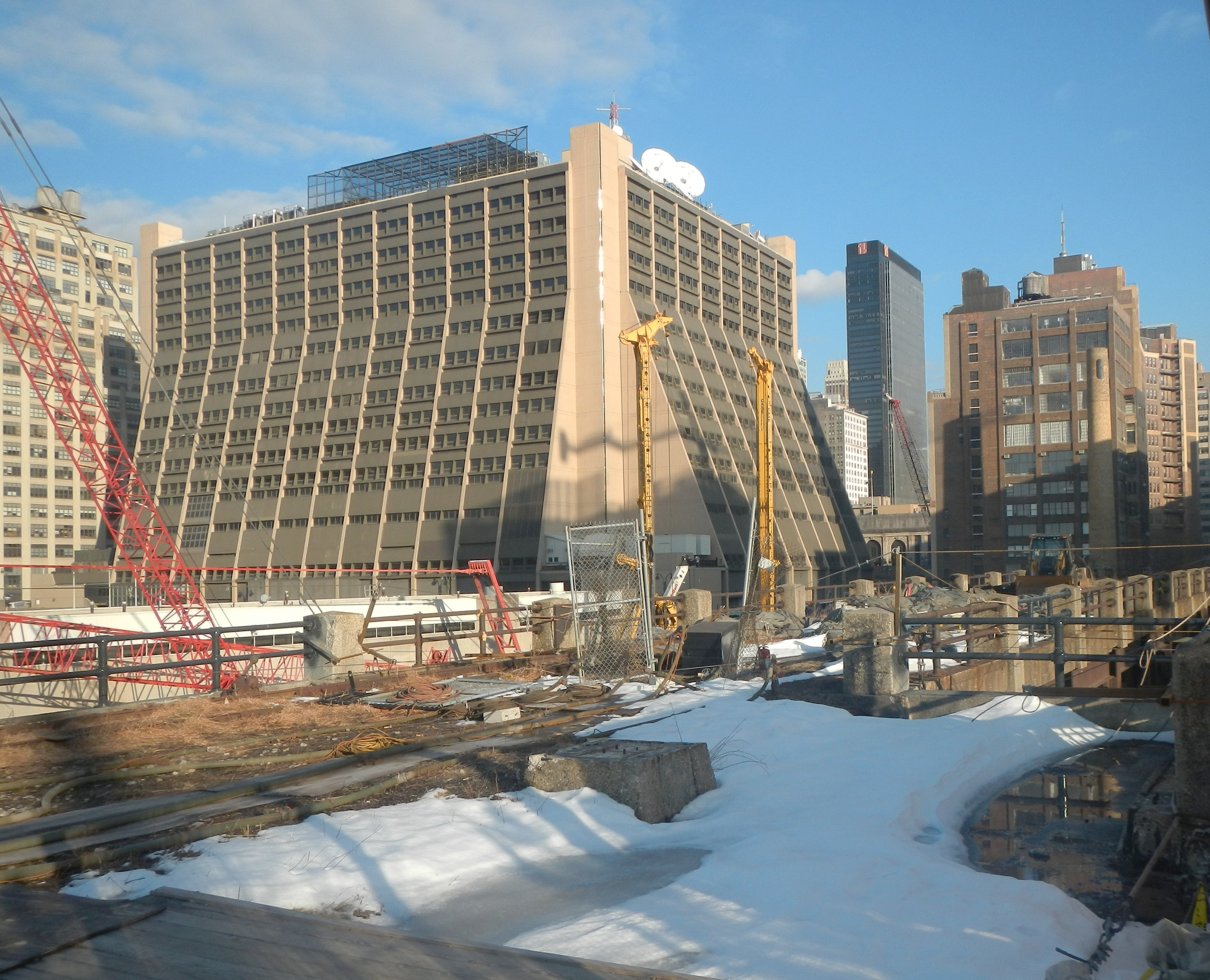
The building before the exterior renovations in 2014.

Five Manhattan West is a 16-story building at 450 West 33rd Street in Hudson Yards, Manhattan, New York City. Previously known as Westyard Distribution Center, it was designed by Davis Brody Bond and opened in 1969.

The building sits above rail tracks running west from Penn Station. The portals of the North River Tunnels and Empire Connection are beneath the building.

== History ==
The building opened in 1969. It is 16 stories tall and covers about 1.8 million square feet (170,000 m^{2}). In the 1980s, the external structure was painted beige and brown metal siding was added. In 2003, cosmetic work was done to the precast concrete facade.

Brookfield Properties acquired the property in 2011. In 2014, Brookfield began a $300 million project to replace the brutalist architecture concrete exterior with a glass facade and replace the interior and mechanical systems. The design work was done by REX, with AAI Architects, P.C. as architect of record. When renovation of the building was completed in 2017, it was renamed 5 Manhattan West. In April 2018, Brookfield obtained a $1.15 billion mortgage loan secured by the building. In September 2025, Brookfield announced plans to refinance the building for $1.25 billion, at which point it was fully occupied.

== Tenants ==
- The New York Daily News moved to the building in 1995 from its former headquarters at the Daily News Building. It moved out in 2011 and has since relocated to other sites.
- DoubleClick was a tenant from 1999 to 2003.
- The Associated Press was a tenant from 2004 to 2017, after moving from its former headquarters at Rockefeller Center.
- R/GA signed a lease to occupy 173,000 square feet in August 2014.
- Markit signed a lease to occupy 140,000 square feet in March 2015.
- JPMorgan Chase expanded its space at the building by 305,000 square feet in June 2017.
- Amazon signed a lease to occupy 359,000 square feet in September 2017 for the primary New York City office of Amazon Advertising.
- Peloton Interactive signed leases for 32,000 square feet in April 2018.
- Whole Foods opened a 60,000 square foot store in the building in July 2020.
- Noom signed a sublease to occupy 113,000 square feet at the building in November 2020, taking space from R/GA.

Additionally, Citizens Food Hall opened within Five Manhattan West in 2021; the food hall's operators announced in January 2025 that it would close that April.
