= Lorenz Educational Press =

Educational publisher based in Dayton, Ohio

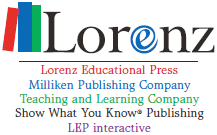
- Parent company: The Lorenz Corporation
- Founded: 2008
- Country of origin: United States
- Headquarters location: Dayton, Ohio
- Publication types: Educational Materials (print and digital)
- Official website: www.lorenzeducationalpress.com

Lorenz Educational Press is an educational publisher based in Dayton, Ohio. The company focuses on educational materials for the K–12 market, including language arts, math, science, social studies, critical thinking, team building, movement and music, and test preparation. Its parent company, The Lorenz Corporation, has been in the publishing industry since 1890.

== History ==
Lorenz Educational Press was founded in 2008, bringing The Lorenz Corporation into the general education market. Within its first year, the company acquired two established companies in the educational market: Milliken Publishing and the Teaching & Learning Company. In 2011, Lorenz Educational Press began distributing Show What You Know Publishing materials.

== Imprints ==
As of February 2014, Lorenz Educational Press has five imprints.

=== Lorenz Educational Press ===
The Lorenz Educational Press imprint focuses on supplementary materials that are outside of the core curriculum but can be integrated into those classes. This includes critical thinking, music and movement, team building, and cross-curricular learning.

=== Milliken Publishing ===
When the Milliken Publishing Company was purchased by Lorenz Educational Press in May 2008, it had been producing supplementary educational products for over 45 years. The operation, originally based in St. Louis, Missouri, was moved to Dayton, Ohio after the acquisition.

The materials under this imprint are intended for pre-kindergarten through high school students and cover core curriculum areas, including language arts, math, science, and social studies.

=== Teaching & Learning Company ===
The Teaching & Learning Company was originally based in Carthage, Illinois, but it was moved to Dayton, Ohio when Lorenz Educational Press purchased the company. The Teaching & Learning Company had been in business for almost 15 years before it was acquired in November 2008.

This imprint includes supplementary materials for preschool through high school. In 1999, Judith S. Gould and Evan Jay Gould developed the four square writing method. A series of books based on this method, and written by Judith and Evan Gould and Mary F. Burke, is published by the Teaching & Learning Company.

=== Show What You Know Publishing ===
Show What You Know Publishing (SWYK) was originally maintained by Englefield & Associates and based in Columbus, Ohio. In 2011, Lorenz Educational Press became the exclusive distributor for Show What You Know Publishing, moving the headquarters to its office in Dayton, Ohio.

This imprint focuses on test-preparation materials for state tests, such as the Ohio Achievement Assessment, Ohio Graduation Test, State of Texas Assessments of Academic Readiness, Measurements of Student Progress in Washington, the Colorado Academic Standards tests, and the Common Core tests.

In 2012, SWYK launched the web-based program Show What You Know Online, partnering with technology entrepreneurs Robert Ott and Ken Reed and with Sunburst Digital for national sales and marketing. The program provides teachers with online assessments and lessons for math and language arts based on either the Common Core State Standards or the State of Texas Assessments of Academic Readiness. The lessons include videos from Khan Academy, making the program the first educational system to officially license lesson videos from the educational website.

=== LEP Interactive ===
LEP interactive focuses on digital products, such as interactive whiteboard software and instant downloads.
