= Daisy Veerasingham =

British businesswoman and lawyer

- Born: August 1969
- Occupations: President and CEO of the Associated Press

Daisy Rubini Veerasingham is a British businesswoman who has been the president and CEO of the Associated Press since 2021, succeeding Gary Pruitt.

== Life ==
Daisy Veerasingham was born in August 1969. She grew up in London and holds a degree in law. She worked for LexisNexis and the Financial Times. In 2004, she joined AP and was a sales director for the AP Television in London. By 2019, she was senior vice president and chief revenue officer for the company. She was later executive vice president and chief operating officer.

Veerasingham joined AP in 2004 as sales director for AP Television News in London. Previously she was group sales and marketing director at LexisNexis and held sales and marketing roles at the Financial Times.

Veerasingham became the first woman, first "person of colour" and first person from outside of the United States to lead the AP in its 175-year history. Fifty-one years old when she took over, she was identified as a "first-generation Briton of Sri Lankan descent". News reports noted that her appointment reflected the "changing portrait of the AP, where 40% of the company's revenue, double what it was 15 years ago, is now generated outside of the United States."
