= Mark Lavie =

American journalist

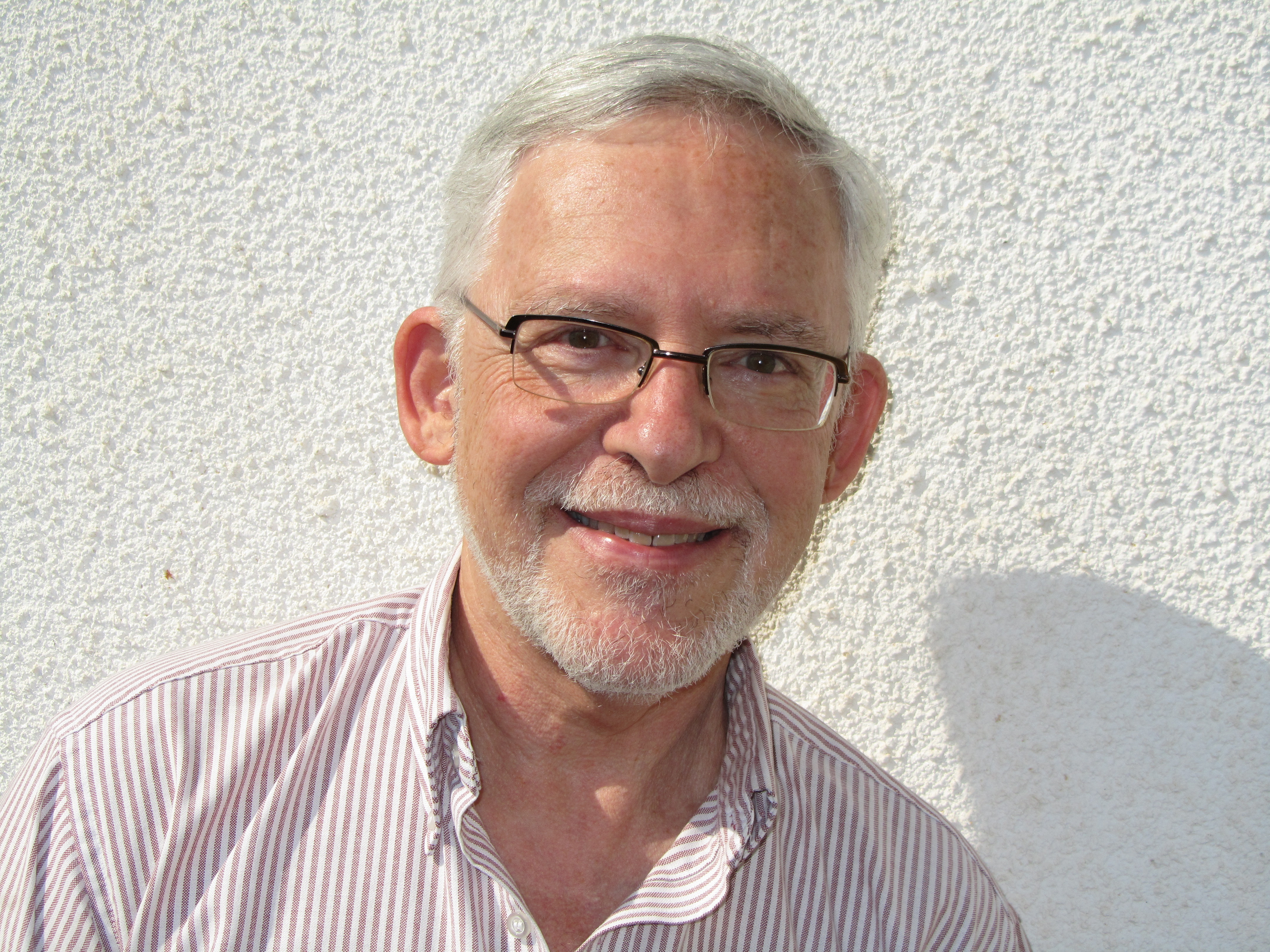
Mark Lavie in 2013

Mark Lavie is an American-Israeli journalist who began covering the Middle East in 1972. Lavie was born and grew up in Fort Wayne, Indiana, and graduated from Indiana University Bloomington in 1969.

He worked as an Associated Press correspondent in the Middle East for 15 years, concluding in 2014. He has worked as a radio reporter for National Public Radio (NPR, U.S.), NBC, Mutual Broadcasting System, and the Canadian Broadcasting Corporation. He won the Overseas Press Club's Lowell Thomas Award for “Best radio interpretation of foreign affairs” in 1994.

Lavie has accused the Associated Press and other news outlets of reporting a biased view of the Israeli Arab conflict.

Following his first book written during the Arab Spring in which Lavie was posted by the Associated Press in Cairo, he wrote a second book describing why Israel's focus on its existential threats is wrong and that the country should focus on its domestic challenges.

== Books ==
- Broken Spring: An American-Israeli reporter's close-up view of how Egyptians lost their struggle for freedom, 2014 ISBN 9652296686
- Why are We Still Afraid: A Reporter's 46-Year Story of Israel Growing Strong, 2018 ISBN 1096200279
