= Four square writing method =

The four square writing method is a way for teaching writing to children in school. While primarily used to teach persuasive writing, it has also been used to help teach deconstruction. The method was developed by Judith S. Gould and Evan Jay Gould.

It was developed initially for primary school students, but it has also been used in high school classes.

== Method ==
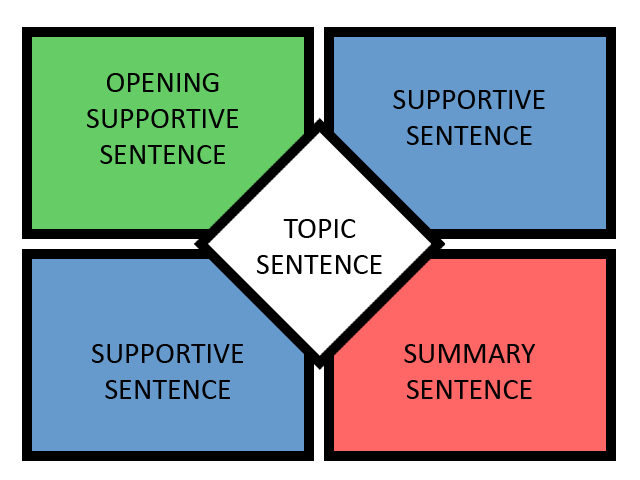
A colour-coded example of a four square writing method layout.

The method is primarily a visual framework for assisting students with formulating ideas in an organized manner prior to writing an essay.

The concept generally works as follows:

1. A large square is drawn and divided into four smaller squares of equal size. An additional rectangle is drawn in the center of the figure overlapping each of the other four squares. A total of five rectangles are thus created.
2. The student writes a complete topic sentence in the center rectangle.
3. Then, the student writes three sentences that develop the thesis of the central topic, placing one in each of the following squares: upper-left, upper-right, and lower-left. The upper-left square contains the opening supportive sentence, and the next two squares contain other supporting information.
4. Finally, the student writes a summary sentence in the lower-right square. The summary sentence describes how the reader is intended to feel about the topic.

Variations of the above rules may require more or less development in each of the rectangles, depending on the grade-level or maturity of the student.

== Results ==
Results show a consistent increase in the ability of students to write persuasively. A study at Springview Elementary School, in Allendale Charter Township, Michigan, noted, "significant growth was observed in the students' writings in both classes."

Another study, carried out at American Senior High School in Miami-Dade County, Florida with older students, showed an increase in FCAT scores, though not as marked as the Michigan grade school students. It was noted that one teacher had remarkably more success with the program than others, and that teachers must be trained thoroughly to get best results from this method.

Kingsley Elementary School in Kingsport, Tennessee also tested the four square writing method. After teaching students using the method, the students' writing scores increased by 49 percentage points in the first year. The same students used it again the next year, and their scores went up an additional nine percentage points.

== Four square series ==
In 1999, Judith S. Gould and Evan Jay Gould wrote the first book in a series dedicated to the four square writing method. This series is published by the Teaching & Learning Company, a Lorenz Educational Press company. As of February 2014, the series includes 16 books, 2 poster papers, and a set of wall charts.

Title	Author(s)	ISBN	Release date
Four Square: Writing Method for Grades 1-3	Judith S. Gould and Evan Jay Gould	9781573101882	1999
Four Square: Writing Method for Grades 4-6	Judith S. Gould and Evan Jay Gould	9781573101899	1999
Four Square: Writing Method for Grades 7-9	Judith S. Gould and Evan Jay Gould	9781573101905	1999
Four Square: The Total Writing Classroom for Grades 1-4	Judith S. Gould and Evan Jay Gould	9781573103336	2002
Four Square: The Total Writing Classroom for Grades 5-9	Judith S. Gould and Evan Jay Gould	9781573103343	2002
My Four Square Writing Poster Paper: Grades 1-3	Judith S. Gould and Evan Jay Gould	9781573104159	2003
My Four Square Writing Poster Paper: Grades 4-6	Sydney Mainor and Evan Jay Gould || 9781573104166 || 2003		
Four Square: Writing in the Content Areas for Grades 1-4	Judith S. Gould and Evan Jay Gould	9781573104210	2004
Four Square: Writing in the Content Areas for Grades 5-9	Judith S. Gould and Evan Jay Gould	9781573104227	2004
Four Square: Writing Method Wall Charts	Judith S. Gould and Evan Jay Gould	9781573104326	2004
Four Square: The Personal Writing Coach for Grades 1-3	Judith S. Gould and Mary F. Burke	9781573104463	2005
Four Square: The Personal Writing Coach for Grades 4-6	Judith S. Gould and Mary F. Burke	9781573104470	2005
Four Square: The Personal Writing Coach for Grades 7-9	Judith S. Gould and Mary F. Burke	9781573104487	2005
Four Square for Writing Assessment: Elementary Level	Judith S. Gould and Mary F. Burke	9781429118194	2010
Four Square for Writing Assessment: Secondary Level	Judith S. Gould and Mary F. Burke	9781429118200	2010
Four Square: Writing Method for Early Learners	Judith S. Gould and Mary F. Burke	9781429117401	2010
Four Square: Writing Method for Grades 1-3 with Enhanced CD	Judith S. Gould, Evan Jay Gould, and Mary F. Burke	9781429117418	2010
Four Square: Writing Method for Grades 4-6 with Enhanced CD	Judith S. Gould, Evan Jay Gould, and Mary F. Burke	9781429117425	2010
Four Square: Writing Method for Grades 7-9 with Enhanced CD	Judith S. Gould, Evan Jay Gould, and Mary F. Burke	9781429117432	2010
