= TweenTribune =

Online newspaper for children aged 8–15

TweenTribune was a free, not-for-profit online newspaper for children aged 8–15. It is updated daily with stories from the Associated Press that are chosen based on relevancy to pre-adolescents. Kids can post comments to the stories which are moderated by their teachers, and teachers can use the site as a resource for meeting No Child Left Behind requirements for reading, writing and computer skills. The site first appeared on November 21, 2008.

In October 2017, the content was moved and is now available at Teachers | Smithsonian Magazine. It is displayed on the educational resources page and on the learning page. Much of the content still exists, but educators can no longer assign content to students.

TweenTribune has been featured in articles in the Los Angeles Times, Good Housekeeping and Family Circle magazine.

== Financial model ==
TweenTribune.com was a proof-of-concept model for new ways to fund journalism online. The site employed a series of previously untried methods for building audience and revenue.

== Business model ==
To achieve sustainability, the site used a group of strategies to reduce costs:

1. As of January 2010, all content was provided by outside sources. Stories come from the Associated Press, while comments were generated by children in the form of user-generated content (UGC).
2. Editing of comments was provided by teachers, so editing is distributed among users as a means of reducing cost rather than centralizing editing with a paid staff. This is an example of distributive editing (DE).
3. Primary source code was provided by Drupal, a free, open-source code content management system. The site also depended upon other open-source applications, such as Linux, Apache, PHP and MySQL.

== History ==
Alan Jacobson, president of BrassTacksDesign, created TweenTribune as a way of helping his 10-year-old daughter with her homework.

Launched on Nov 21, 2008, the site had little traffic in its first year. In October 2009 page views began to jump dramatically after a new promotional campaign was launched that marketed the site directly to teachers — a strategy that had not been tried before.

As of May 2010, the site received 3.4 million page views per month, and 26,000 teachers were registered. TweenTribune was used in 50,000 classrooms in the U.S., Australia, Canada and Japan.

In 2017, the site was discontinued. Content was incorporated into the online Smithsonian website. Educational and learning modules exist, but the model for specific daily updates geared to the Tween years is no longer provided.
