= Helmut Laux =

German photographer

Helmut Laux (10 June 1916 in Donaueschingen – 29 April, 1987) was a German photographer who rose to prominence in Nazi Germany and who headed the so-called Buro Laux, a photo news agency jointly-operated by the SS and the German Foreign Ministry.

== Buro Laux ==
The Buro/Bureau Laux had as its director, SS-Obersturmführer Helmut Laux. As the personal photographer of foreign minister Joachim von Ribbentrop, Laux was often part of Hitler's entourage and was present at important state receptions. With the declaration of war with the United States, the Buro Laux incorporated the Berlin operations of Associated Press (AP GmbH) and its photo archive. This transaction was cemented with the help of both the Foreign Office and the SS against the wishes of the Ministry of Propaganda.

Some of the Buro Laux's employees were civilians but many key personnel joined the Waffen-SS, though only Laux himself is said to have always worn his SS uniform.

The bureau was not located in offices belonging to the Foreign Office, but initially in Laux's luxurious seven-room apartment at Innsbrucker Straße 44 in Berlin-Schöneberg. Prisoners from the Sachsenhausen concentration camp were also employed there.

It was Laux who took a famous photograph of Stalin toasting with von Ribbentrop after the signing of the notorious Molotov–Ribbentrop Pact. Stalin reputedly commented that it would not be a good idea to publish the picture. Laux went to remove the film from the camera to give it to Stalin, but Stalin with a wave of his hand assured him that he "trusted the word of a German". Due to this the photograph still exists.

The Buro Laux was able to pursue its full range of activities from the spring/summer of 1942. It provided photographers who documented all important events involving Ribbentrop and even travelled abroad to produce pictures for the Foreign Office. These were mainly supplied to the German press through the Deutscher Verlag publishing house. The Buro Laux also supplied foreign newspapers with pictures and provided the press attachés at the German embassies with photos that made Ribbentrop and his translator Paul Schmidt look important.

Laux himself travelled widely in the occupied territories and in the war zones, collecting photo material. He was even in Baghdad before the British took back control of the city.

== The AP "deal" ==
Investigators (chiefly Norman Domeier of the University of Vienna) have in recent years brought to wider attention the (well known in some circles) secret that there was a deal between Associated Press and the German government related to the interchange of press photos during the period in which the United States was at war with Germany.

The mechanism for this interchange was that a courier flew to Lisbon and back each day transporting photos from and for Germany's wartime enemy, the US, via diplomatic pouch. The transactions were initially conducted at the AP bureau under Luiz Lupi in Lisbon, and from 1944, when the exchange via Lisbon took too long, also at the AP bureau in Stockholm under Eddie Shanke. Here, as a cover, the Swedish agency, Pressens Bild, was involved as an intermediary. An estimated 40,000 photos were exchanged between the enemies in this way.

The key figure in establishing the photo exchange, and Laux's superior, was SS-Obersturmbannführer Dr. Paul Karl Schmidt, later known as Paul Carell, one of the most successful ministerial careerists of Nazi Germany.

AP published their own version of events during World War II.

== Later life ==
Laux's activity after 1945 is largely a mystery. He did spend considerable time in prisoner-of-war camps, but he does not seem to have been banned from exercising his profession as a photographer. An article in Der Spiegel in 1947 dealing with a camp in the neighbourhood of Darmstadt, where former SS personnel were being held, specifically mentions Laux as one of the inmates.

He received denazification clearance and was soon able to reactivate his contacts abroad. He contributed glossy photos of various leading Nazis from D-Day 1944 to the 14 June 1948 edition of Life, signing as "Photographer Helmut Laux of the Berliner Illustrirte Zeitung".
