= Do Not Open =

Book by John Farndon

- Book cover
- Author: John Farndon
- Illustrator: Mr Bingo, Khuan Caveman Co., Gilman Calsen, Sheila Collins, Craig Conlan, Alain Goffin, Hennie Haworth, Headcase Design, Irene Jacobs, Neal Murren, Led Pants, Ali Pellatt
- Cover artist: Sophia M Tampakopoulos Turner
- Language: English
- Subject: General Knowledge
- Publisher: Dorling Kindersley
- Publication date: (UK) October 25, 2007 (USA) November 7, 2007 (CAN) November 6, 2007
- Publication place: United Kingdom
- Media type: Hardback
- Pages: 256
- ISBN: 978-1-4053-2207-2
- Preceded by: Pick Me Up
- Followed by: Take Me Back

Do Not Open: An encyclopedia of the world's best-kept secrets is a book published on October 25, 2007, by Dorling Kindersley and written by John Farndon. Its cover artist was Sophia M Tampakopoulos Turner and was illustrated by Mr Bingo, Khuan Caveman Co., Gilman Calsen, Sheila Collins, Craig Conlan, Alain Goffan, Gennie Haworth, Headcase Design, Irene Jacobs, Neal Murren, Led Pants, and Ali Pellatt. It was preceded by Pick Me Up and was followed by Take Me Back.

== Reviews ==
Reviews in Publishers Weekly, Library Journal, Booklist, Kirkus and Wall Street Journal.
