= Pick Me Up (book) =

- Author: David Roberts, Jeremy Leslie
- Illustrator: Izabella Bielawska, John Critchley, Corrina Drossel, James Grubb, Katharina Rocksien, Emmi Salonen
- Cover artist: eBoy
- Language: English
- Subject: General knowledge
- Genre: Encyclopedia
- Publisher: Dorling Kindersley
- Publication date: 25 September 2006
- Publication place: United Kingdom, United States
- Media type: Book
- Pages: 352
- ISBN: 978-0-7566-2159-9
- Followed by: Do Not Open

Pick Me Up is an encyclopedic non-fiction book primarily intended for children. As the cover states, it is a collection of "Stuff you need to know". Pick Me Up is arranged into eight categories. These are: Science, Technology and Space; Society, Places and Beliefs; History; The Natural World; People Who Made the World; Arts, Entertainment and Media; You and Your Body; and Planet Earth. Each category has 10–40 separate articles. Pick Me Up was created by David Roberts and Jeremy Leslie. The articles within Pick Me Up were written by more than 20 different writers.

== Design ==
Pick Me Up is designed unconventionally, using striking headlines to articles to grab attention. For example, "Was Beethoven a punk?". It then discusses why some people would think of him as a punk. It will also have several articles per page all related to one topic but not each other. It also uses different approaches to a topic. For example, instead of writing several articles about different animals, Pick Me Up discusses what animal is man's best friend.

== See also ==
- Do Not Open
