= Ohio Achievement Assessment =

Standardized test in Ohio, United States

The Ohio Achievement Assessment is no longer administered. Ohio now administers Ohio's State Tests.

The Ohio Achievement Assessment (commonly stylized as the OAA) is a standardized test meeting NCLB requirements. Grades 3-8 are tested in reading, mathematics, science, social studies, and writing. Before 2010, the Ohio Achievement Assessment was known as the Ohio Achievement Test.

Students in grades 2, 3, 4, 6, and 7 are tested in reading and mathematics. Students in grades 5 & 8 are tested in reading, mathematics, and science. Grades 4 and 7 are tested in writing, however, in 2009, the writing test was canceled (students in grades 4 and 7 were tested in writing) and the social studies test was suspended for the 2010–11 and 2011-12 school years. The social studies test did return for the 2013-14 school year.

Districts are graded based on a system of 26 indicators. Schools who meet at least 75% passing in all tests in grades 3-8, 85% percent above proficient on the OGT in grades 10-11, 90% graduation rate. and a 93% rate of attendance receive an "Excellent" rating on their school district report card issues by the state yearly. Any district that fails to make 20 indicators receives an "effective" or a "proficient" rating.
