= Measurements of Student Progress =

The Measurements of Student Progress (MSP), successor to the WASL, was a test taken by students throughout Washington state, ranging from grades 3–8. The SBAC has taken its place.

== Subjects ==
The MSP tested Mathematics, Science, Reading, and Writing.

- Mathematics consisted of multiple choice questions with skills learned in the grade.
- Reading consisted of multiple choice questions and free response questions. Students read a story then answered the questions.
- Writing consisted of writing two stories. A prompt was included.
- Science included multiple choice questions related to different science processes. There was a sample lab in which the student conducted analysis and conclusion.

Mathematics and Reading were tested in grades 3–8. Science was tested in grades 5 and 8. Writing was tested in grades 4 and 7.
