= Budtender =

Staff member in a cannabis dispensary

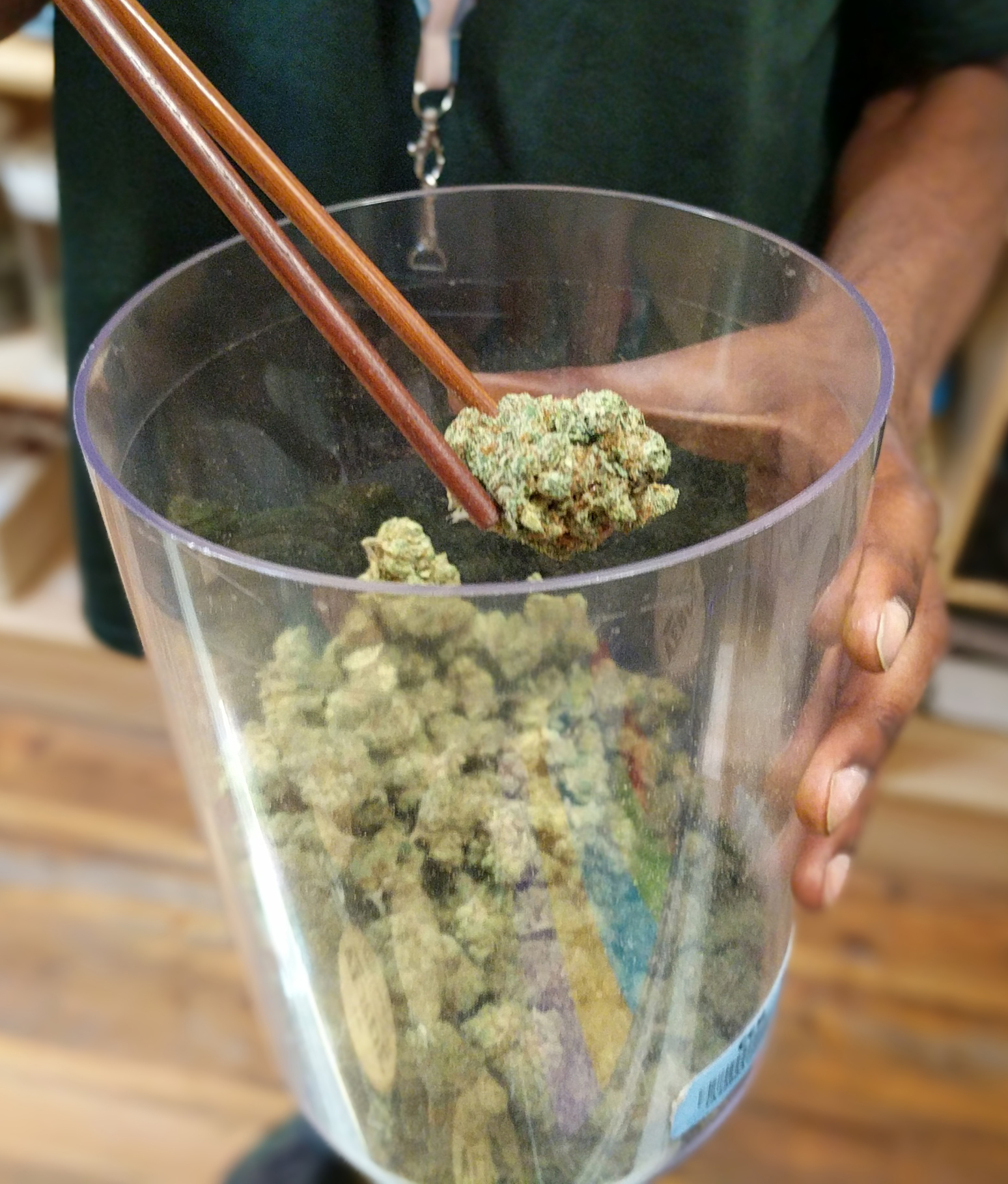
Budtender handling cannabis at a dispensary in Colorado in 2018

A budtender is a title of a staff member who works within a dispensary or store where medical or recreational cannabis is sold. Their job is to offer suggestions to customers, answer questions, handle products and showcase products being sold.

== Origin ==
According to Merriam-Webster, budtender is a portmanteau that combines the word bartender and bud. Like a bartender, budtenders serve customers within a licensed establishment while the word bud is referring to the dried flower tops of cannabis used for consumption. It dates back to at least 1997, shortly after cannabis was legalized in California for medical use.

== Qualifications ==
The first budtenders gained knowledge through Cannabis farmers, extraction technicians, edible chefs and other cannabis experts. In the early days of legalized medical cannabis no prior schooling was needed to work as a budtender. As of 2017, no license or certification is needed to be a budtender. Because Cannabis is still illegal on a national level, no national licensing standards have been implemented in the United States. Oklahoma requirements are to obtain a credentials license to be able to work the medical marijuana business. The rules and regulations are at Oklahoma Medicaid Marijuana Authority website, OMMA.

== Careers ==
=== Experience and knowledge ===
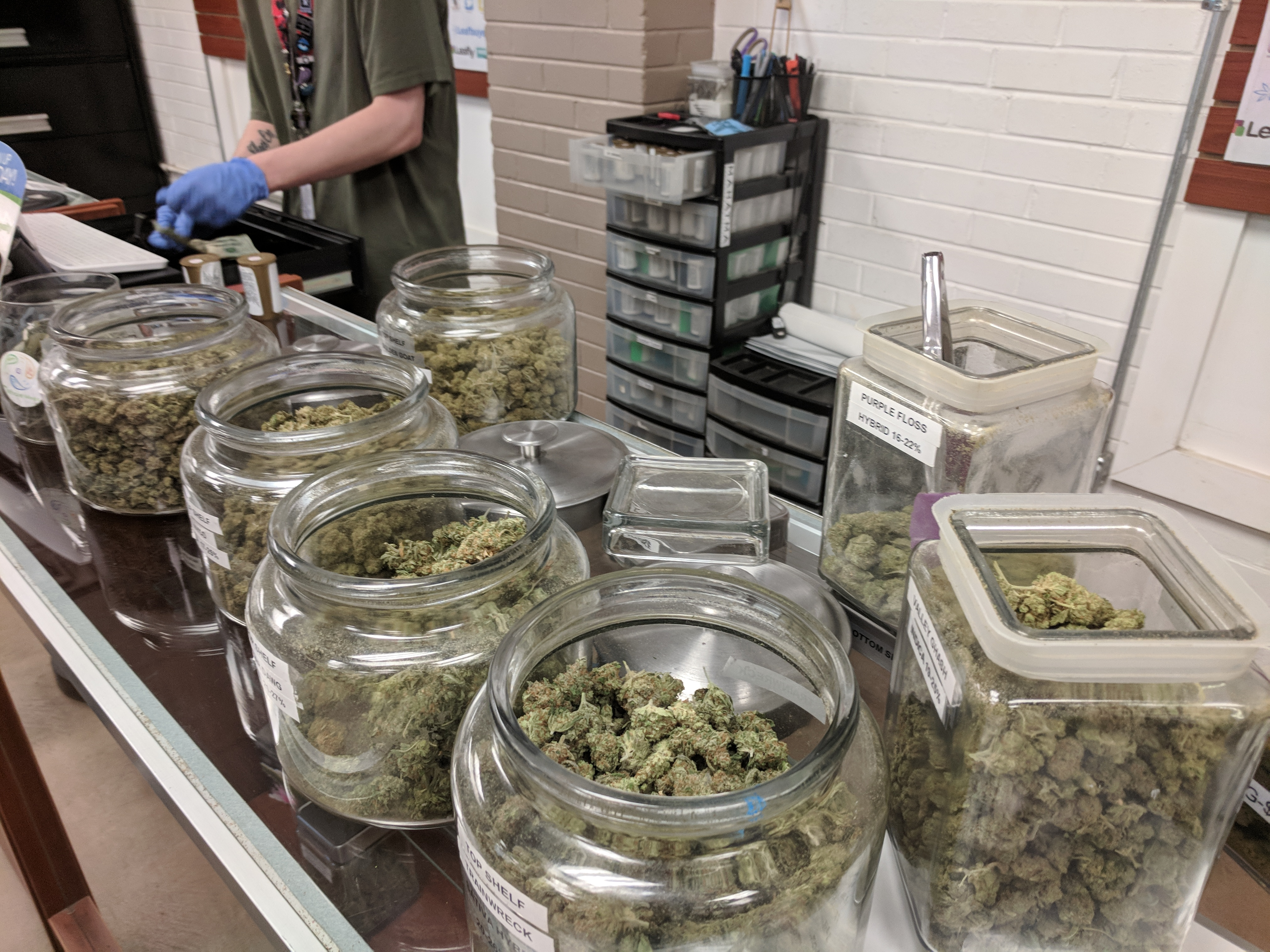
Budtender behind a counter with various cannabis strains, 2018

Budtenders have to be qualified to work in a dispensary and must have a wide range of cannabis knowledge. In order to provide customers with a positive experience at a dispensary, budtenders need to demonstrate their knowledge of strains, cannabis products and medical use. They need to know the characteristics of each strain of cannabis they sell, based on their taste, smell and effects. If a customer were to ask about a specific strain that the dispensary does not have, a budtender should be able to recommend a similar strain with their broad understanding of cannabis in terms of the attributes of the customer’s original request. A budtender should also be able to adhere to the necessity for a medical marijuana user. Their ability to understand the medical circumstances of certain strains is critical and essential for the safety of the customer. Budtenders may stay aware of cannabis trends by checking social media and industry blogs.

=== Customer service ===
Since budtenders work one-on-one with customers, it is essential that they provide a welcoming environment for them. A budtender's job is to provide and share their knowledge of cannabis with a customer, have the ability to teach those who have never tried cannabis before and to provide insight to new trends or strains. Budtenders also sometimes share stories in order to market to a customer and also to create a friendlier environment. These stories are meant to provide apprehension of what a customer might feel or do when they use a certain type of cannabis. However, budtenders are not recommended to push their products by telling fake stories and experiences in order to get a customer to buy something; this is considered bad customer service within the industry. Finally, budtenders are also highly recommended to express a sense of passion for their product in order to spark interest from a customer.

== Legality in the United States ==
In the United States, there are 24 states that have legalized recreational marijuana, and 38 states that have made medical marijuana legal as of 2023. Budtenders in these states are held to state legislation, and must comply with state law.

=== Oregon ===
Oregon, one of the 15 recreational marijuana states, is regulated by the Oregon Liquor Control Commission (OLCC), and require all budtenders to be at least 21 years or older to obtain a license and/or permit. Whether it be production or processing purposes, any budtender who actively handles marijuana, must have a permit to secure or sell marijuana items. Having these permits is necessary under Oregon law, however; permits are only valid for five years from the date issued by the OLCC. All permits under the commission grant an employee access to any licensed marijuana business in the state. Being a fairly regulated business, all budtenders are required by state law to have their worker permits readily available at any time while working, in case of immediate inspection by OLCC regulatory staff or enforcement officer. It is advised to keep the permit on one's self when working, for this immediate reason. If a budtender who possesses a legal permit were to be convicted by the state for misdemeanor or felony, they have 10 days to submit a written notification to the Commission. No permit is transferable; the permit to sell recreational marijuana belongs to the permittee. The only applicable license type that allows the sale of marijuana items to a consumer is the retail license. Every retailer must verify the age of every customer, for any and all purchases, and can only sell between the hours of 7am-10pm. A budtender cannot offer free samples to customers, give free marijuana items, or provide any form of discount if the sale is inline with the sale of other items. Retailers may only receive marijuana products from the OLCC licensed producers, processors, and wholesalers.

== Legality in Canada ==
In 2018, Canada became the second nation in the world to legalize recreational marijuana. Budtending quickly emerged as a popular career choice for many cannabis enthusiasts following legalization in spite of the high turnover rate in the industry. Budtenders in Canada make CA$16.50/hr on average and as of 2024, the job outlook for future budtending opportunities was low in the majority of provinces. The federal government, including agencies like Health Canada, have set regulations for certain products such as edibles being capped at 10 mg THC per package. Budtending regulations and licensing in particular have largely been left up to individual provinces.

=== Alberta ===
Cannabis is regulated in Alberta by the Alberta Gaming, Liquor and Cannabis Commission which requires all budtenders to be 18 years of age or older and receive a Qualified Cannabis Worker (QCW) qualification from the province to work as a budtender. To receive a QCW, an applicant must pass a background check and take a qualification course consisting of knowledge required to work in the field.
