= News bureau =

Branch of a newspaper, newsmagazine, news broadcaster, or wire service

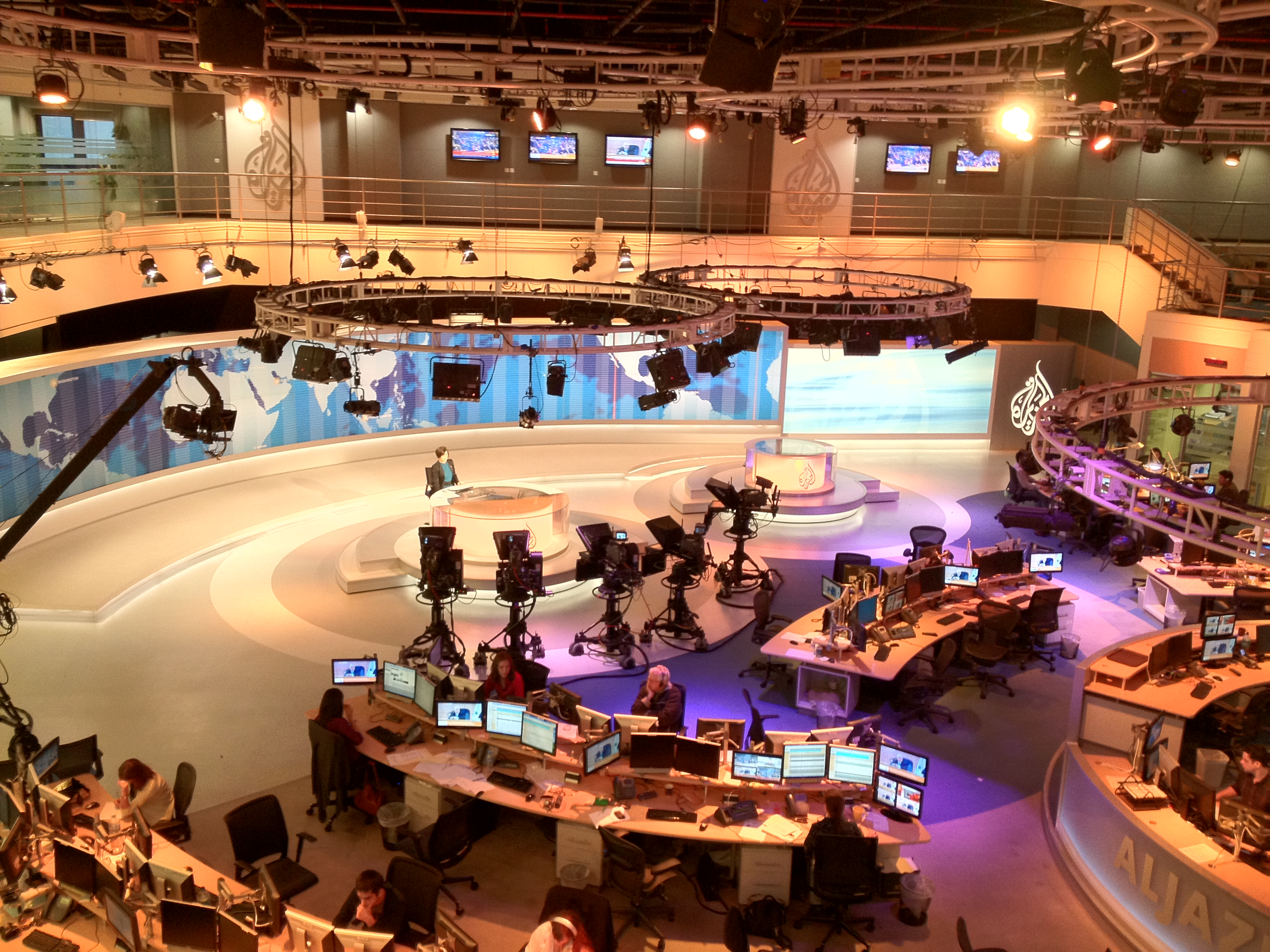
Al-Jazeera English newsdesk within a newsroom in the Doha headquarters

A news bureau is an office for gathering or distributing news. Similar terms are used for specialized bureaus, often to indicate a geographic location or scope of coverage: a 'Tokyo bureau' refers to a given news operation's office in Tokyo; a 'foreign bureau' is a generic term for a news office set up in a country other than the primary operations center; a 'Washington bureau' is an office, typically located in Washington, D.C., that covers news related to national politics in the United States. The person in charge of a news bureau is often called the bureau chief.

The term is distinct from a news desk, which refers to the editorial function of assigning reporters and other staff, and otherwise coordinating, news stories, and sometimes the physical desk where that occurs, but without regard to the geographic location or overall operation of the news organization. For example, a foreign bureau is located in a foreign country and refers to all creative and administrative operations that take place there, whereas a foreign desk describes only editorial functions and may be located anywhere, possibly as an organizational unit within the news organization's home office.

A news bureau is traditionally operated out of an office by a single news outlet such as a radio, television, or newspaper news program. A single news company such as CNN or NPR may use a single bureau and office staff for all of its programs, and even those of subsidiary or other affiliated companies. For convenience, to save money and space, and to ensure the availability of necessary services (such as video feeds and studios), different companies may share an office space or co-locate at a single office building. News agencies may also operate news bureaus, and major public relations sources (such as governments, large companies, or advocacy groups) may operate news bureaus of their own to create, rather than simply report, news stories.

Traditional news media, particularly television news and newspapers, have cut the number and size of news bureaus in recent decades for several reasons. They face declining profitability due to increasing competition from Internet news sources, and therefore have less money to spend on news-gathering. In 2017, a report entitled The Future Newsroom, which investigated digital-only Australian newsrooms, found that "newsroom staffs […] were counted in tens, not hundreds. News content is more niche and selective [as a result]." In one of the report's case studies, for number of editors, Mumbrella had a low-water mark of "one person rostered to the news desk." In 2019, a survey entitled State of Technology in Global Newsrooms, which researched adoption of digital technology by the global news media industry, found that "[d]igital-only newsroom growth is flat or down everywhere except in East/Southeast Asia, suggesting fewer online start-ups are launching[, and h]ybrid newsrooms are on the rise while traditional newsrooms are declining." Additionally, "[m]ost newsrooms are small [ten or fewer full-time employees] – and digital-only organizations are the smallest[, and t]he only newsrooms that are expanding are small ones."

In 2006, Reuters opened its first virtual news bureau, staffing real-life reporters in a virtual office in Second Life. CNN followed suit in October 2007, but took a citizen journalism approach, allowing residents of Second Life to submit their own reportage. Although the news audience of Second Life is relatively small, and declining, media consider it a training ground for themselves and participants, applicable to future virtual news projects.
