= The Lorenz Corporation =

- Predecessor: Lorenz Publishing Company
- Founded: 1890
- Founder: E.S. Lorenz
- Country of origin: United States
- Headquarters location: Dayton, Ohio
- Distribution: GIA Publications
- Publication types: sheet music, magazines, books
- Nonfiction topics: church music, education
- Owner(s): Lorenz family
- Official website: www.lorenz.com

The Lorenz Corporation, previously known as Lorenz Publishing Company, is a music publisher located in Dayton, Ohio, United States. It is best known for its publication of church music for smaller congregations served by amateur musicians. It also publishes other varieties of music and general education materials.

== History ==
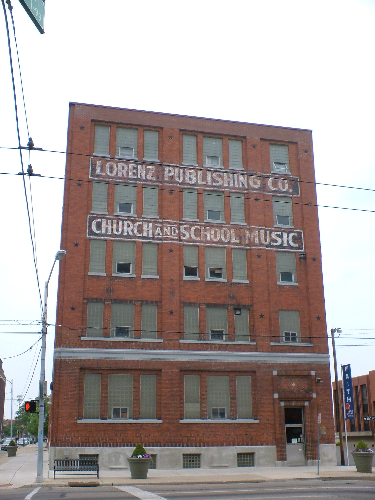
The Lorenz Music Company's office at 501 East 3rd Street in Dayton, Ohio

The company was founded by E.S. Lorenz in 1890 and has been under the management of E.S. Lorenz and his descendants since that time. The idea came in 1889 "when he had compiled a hymnal for the United Brethren Publishing House located in downtown Dayton." In the 1970s and 1980s, the company changed its name to Lorenz Industries, and then The Lorenz Corporation. Reiff Lorenz, a great great grandson of the founder, operates the company today.

The company filed for federal bankruptcy protection on August 19, 2020.

== Current business ==
Some of its active imprints are dedicated to music publishing and others focus on general education.

=== Music publishing ===
Copyrights/Imprints

- Heritage Music Press
- Lorenz
- The Roger Dean Company
- SoundForth
- Word Music & Church Resources

Subscriptions

The Lorenz Corporation has nine bi-monthly publications for musicians, including the following:

Keyboard
- The Organist (ISSN 1931-6178)
- The Organ Portfolio (ISSN 0193-6670)
- The Sacred Organ Journal (ISSN 0036-2263)
- The Church Pianist (ISSN 0890-9032)
- Keyboard Worship & Praise (ISSN 1936-8836)
Handbell
- Ring and Rejoice (ISSN 1940-6436)
Choral
- The SAB Choir (ISSN 0744-0200)
- The Volunteer Choir (ISSN 1064-8933)
Classroom
- Activate! (ISSN 1931-4736)

=== Educational publishing ===
The Lorenz Corporation started publishing general education materials under Lorenz Educational Press in 2008.

Copyrights/Imprints

- LEP Interactive
- Lorenz Educational Press
- Milliken Publishing
- Teaching and Learning Company
- Show What You Know® Publishing
