= Bandar Lengeh =

City in Hormozgan province, Iran

Bandar Lengeh بندر لنگه
- City
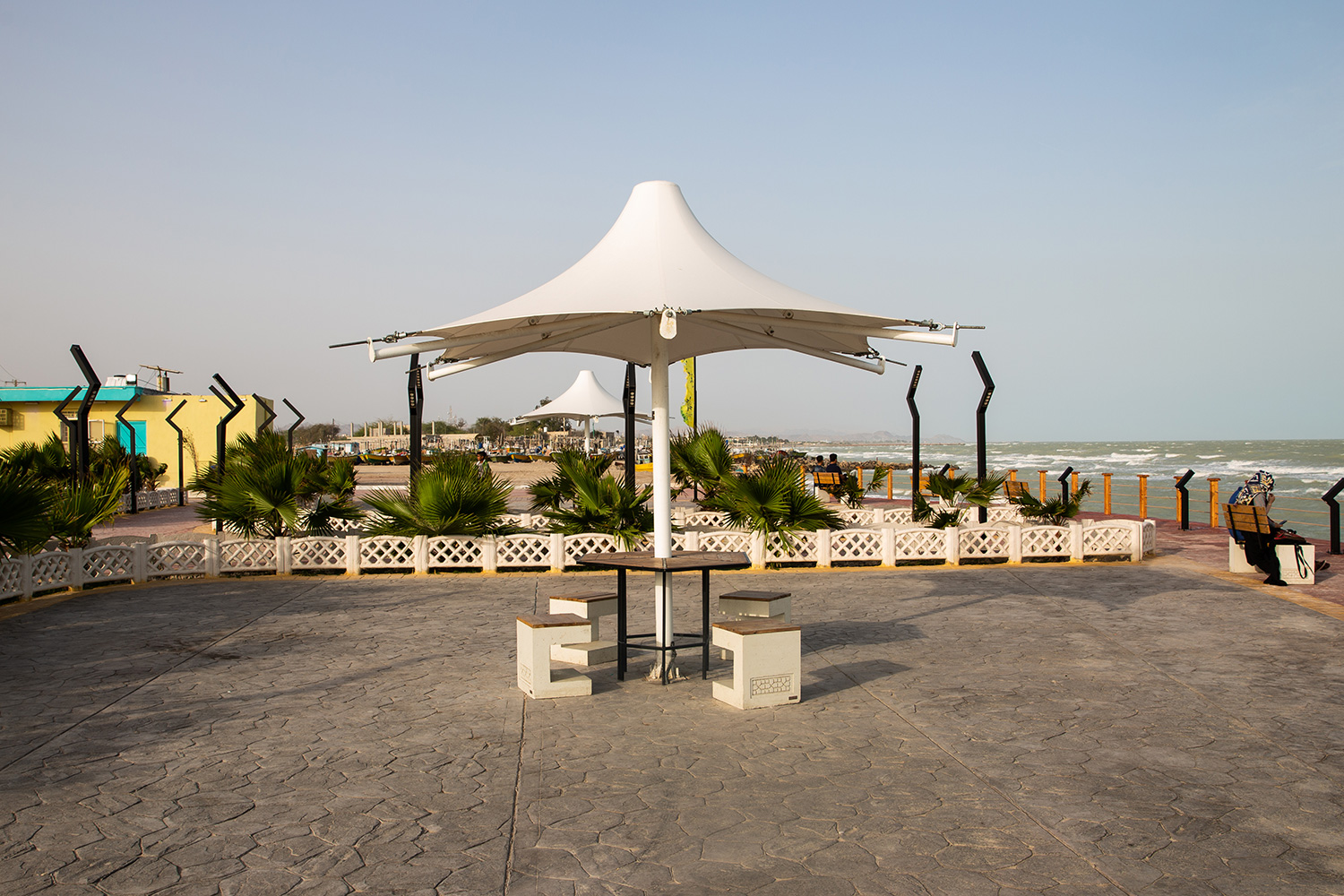
- Beach at Bandar Lengeh

- Location within Iran Location within Persian Gulf
- Coordinates: 26°33′34″N 54°53′06″E
- Country: Iran
- Province: Hormozgan
- County: Bandar Lengeh
- District: Central

Population (2016)
  - Total: 30,435
- Time zone: UTC+3:30 (IRST)

Bandar Lengeh (Persian: بندرلنگه) (Note: Also romanized as Bandar Langeh, Bandar-e Lengeh, and Bandar-e-Langeh; also known as Lingah, Lengeh, Linja, and Linjah) is a city in the Central District of Bandar Lengeh County, Hormozgan province, Iran, serving as capital of both the county and the district.

Bandar Lengeh is a port city on the Persian Gulf, 280 km (170 mi) from Lar, 192 km (119 mi) from Bandar Abbas, and 420 km (260 mi) from Bushehr. The weather in Bandar Lengeh is hot and humid, typical of coastal cities in southern Iran.

== History ==
=== 18th century ===
It has been suggested that the Achaemenid port Guranga was located in the same place as Bandar Lengeh, but this is not supported by any evidence. In 1674, the French traveler Abbé Carré made the first written mention of Bandar Lengeh under the name Talanga. He described it as a "large Arab village two leagues from Kong" with houses "only made of canes and leaves." The Arab population there were the Huwala people, whose presence extended to Kangan. In 1773, Bandar Lengeh was still a small village, according to the description by English traveller Edward Ives. It was first in the 19th century that Bandar Lengeh attained the status of a commercial trade hub. A Dutch document from 1764 gives the most detailed report of Bandar Lengeh in the 18th century:

"The first place away from Gamron that is inhabited by the Houlas is Lenge (near the of old famous, but now totally ruined Bender Lenge, which the Portuguese once possessed). It is situated outside [the area referred to by] the general name of Houlas. The inhabitants of Lenge are called Mersousies. They are 50 large and small vessels and 700 men strong, of which 350 are armed with match- locks, They are poor and live from [the sale of] firewood and charcoal, which is plentiful near them and which they transport throughout the Gulf. Their present chief is called Sjeek Saijd; he keeps good friendship with us."

Based on this report, according to the Iranologist Willem Floor: "Assuming a household size of five persons this means that its population probably was about 3,500 at that time." Bandar Lengeh possessed an economy where commerce did not yet occupy a major position. This situation existed because of the unstable conditions in Iran, where the national economy stagnated and international trade decreased by 75% percent or more. The environment grew even more unstable due to regional warfare. After the Iranian ruler Nader Shah died in 1747, a power vacuum followed, in which various factions on both sides of the Persian Gulf fought to fight for dominance. Mohammad Naser Khan Lari, the governor of Lar, was in a conflict with his nominal subordinate, Molla Ali-Shah, the deputy-governor of Bandar Abbas. The Qavasem tribe of Julfar and Bandar Lengeh were amongst the supporters of Naser Khan Lari, while their rivals, the Imamate of Oman, supported Molla Ali-Shah. Operating strictly as an administrator for the Iranian government, the Qavasem chief of Bandar Lengeh was subordinate to the governor of the Fars province.

In August-October 1760, Bandar Lengeh was under an unsuccessful siege by Naser Khan Lari, who had underestimated their preparation. In 1765, 1773/74 and 1777/78, the Qavasem attacked the Qeshm Island and its surroundings. They were defeated each time by Sheikh Mohammad Khan Bastaki, the governor of Bandar Abbas. After the third attack, the Qavasem captured Kong, Bandar Lengeh, Bostaneh and Moghu with help from the Arab Bedouins and Al Marzuq. They were all subsequently defeated by Sheikh Mohammad Khan Bastaki. While the forts in Lashtan and Kong were for some time controlled by the forces of Mohammad Khan Bastaki, he gave the Qavasem permission to settle in Bandar Lengeh and Lashtan. An agreement was concluded between the Qavasem and Mohammad Khan Bastaki, establishing that the Qavasem would subsequently be placed under the jurisdiction of the governor of Bastak.

The leader of the Qavasem at Bandar Lengeh received the title of sheikh and the role of revenue collector from Mohammad Khan Bastaki. This state of subordination to the governor of Bastak continued as late as 1854, as seen in a letter by Tahmasp Mirza Moayyed od-Dowleh, the governor of Fars. In the 1790s, the Qavasem of Lengeh followed the example of the Qavasem of Ras Al Khaimah by joining the Wahhabi movement. By 1803, the Qavasem of Bandar Lengeh and Ras Al Khaimah were operating under the instructions of the Saudi leader to launch offensives against the military forces of Muscat.

=== 19th century ===
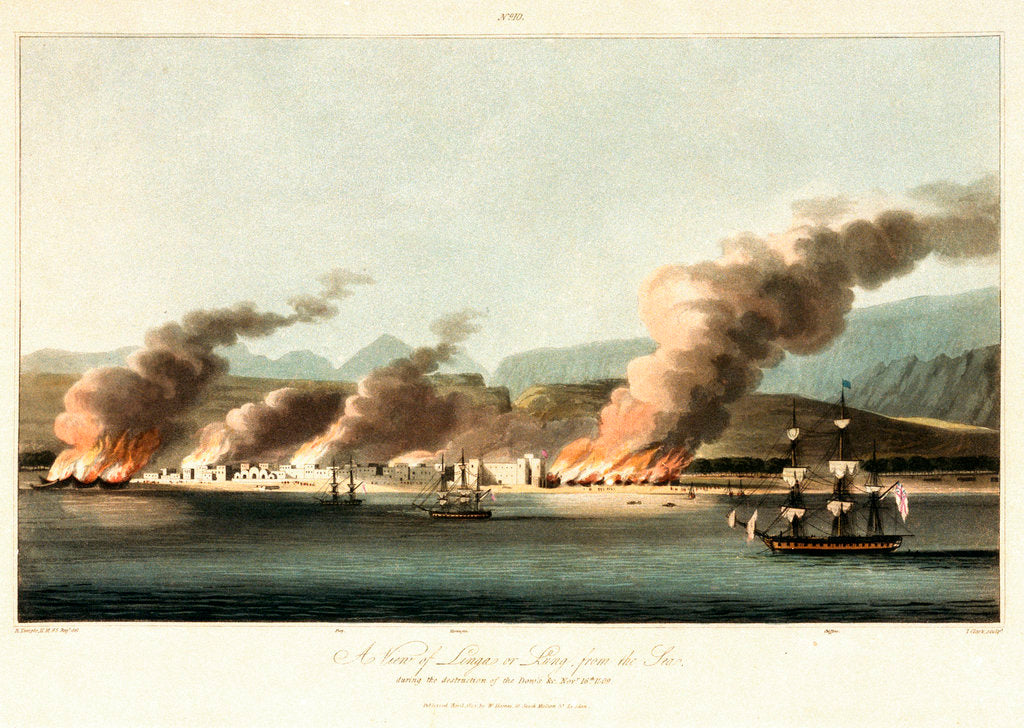
The British Bombay Marine attacking Bandar Lengeh on 16 November 1809

The governor of Fars held a hostile view of the Qavasem and did not support their cooperation with Bastak. In February 1809, he sent a punitive force from Lar that captured Bastak and attacked the Qavasem at Bandar Lengeh and perhaps at Bandar Charak and Bandar-e Nakhilu. This action seemed to align with a wider Iranian policy designed to consolidate power on the coastal strip. The Qavasem temporarily withdrew to Basaidu on Qeshm Island. Involvement in other maritime assaults carried out by the Qavasem extended to the Qavasem chief of Bandar Lengeh. This participation caused the British to view Bandar Lengeh, like Ras Al Khaimah, as a pirate stronghold. In 1809, the British Bombay Marine destroyed twenty Qavasam vessels at Bandar Lengeh.

In 1856, Bandar Lengeh's status as a free-trade zone was put to an end by the Iranian government, which meant that the local sheikhs had to pay more money to them. In the same year and from then onwards, individuals other than the chief of Bastak began to receive appointments to the position of governor of Bandar Lengeh from the governor of Fars. For example, this happened in 1858/59, when the governorship of Bandar Lengeh was given to the governor of Larestan, Mirza Hasan Ali Khan Daryabegi. Upon entering Bandar Lengeh in the 1870s and later decades, an observer would see the Lion and Sun flag of Iran displayed on a tall building in the middle of the town, where the governor resided. The Iranian government utilized this symbol to show that its rule over the coast was secure.

In an effort to remove leaders deemed undependable, the Iranian government attempted to dismantle autonomous principalities whether they were Arab, Baloch, or Kurdish. On 11 September 1887, the Qavasem ruler of Bandar Lengeh, Sheikh Qazib ibn Rashed was arrested by the Iranian authorities. In 1888, the governorship of the Gulf Ports (mamlaket-e Banadar-e Khalij-e Fars) was established by the prime minister Mirza Ali Asghar Khan Amin al-Soltan. The governor was based in Bushehr and held the title of daryabegi. Their area of authority covered the Iranian coastline and islands spanning from Bandar Deylam up to and including Bandar Abbas. Bandar Lengeh was under the jurisdiction of a deputy governor who reported directly to Bushehr. Sheikh Qazib was soon sent to Tehran, where died on 21 March 1897, leaving no offspring. From that point forward, no further Arab officials were selected to govern Bandar Lengeh.

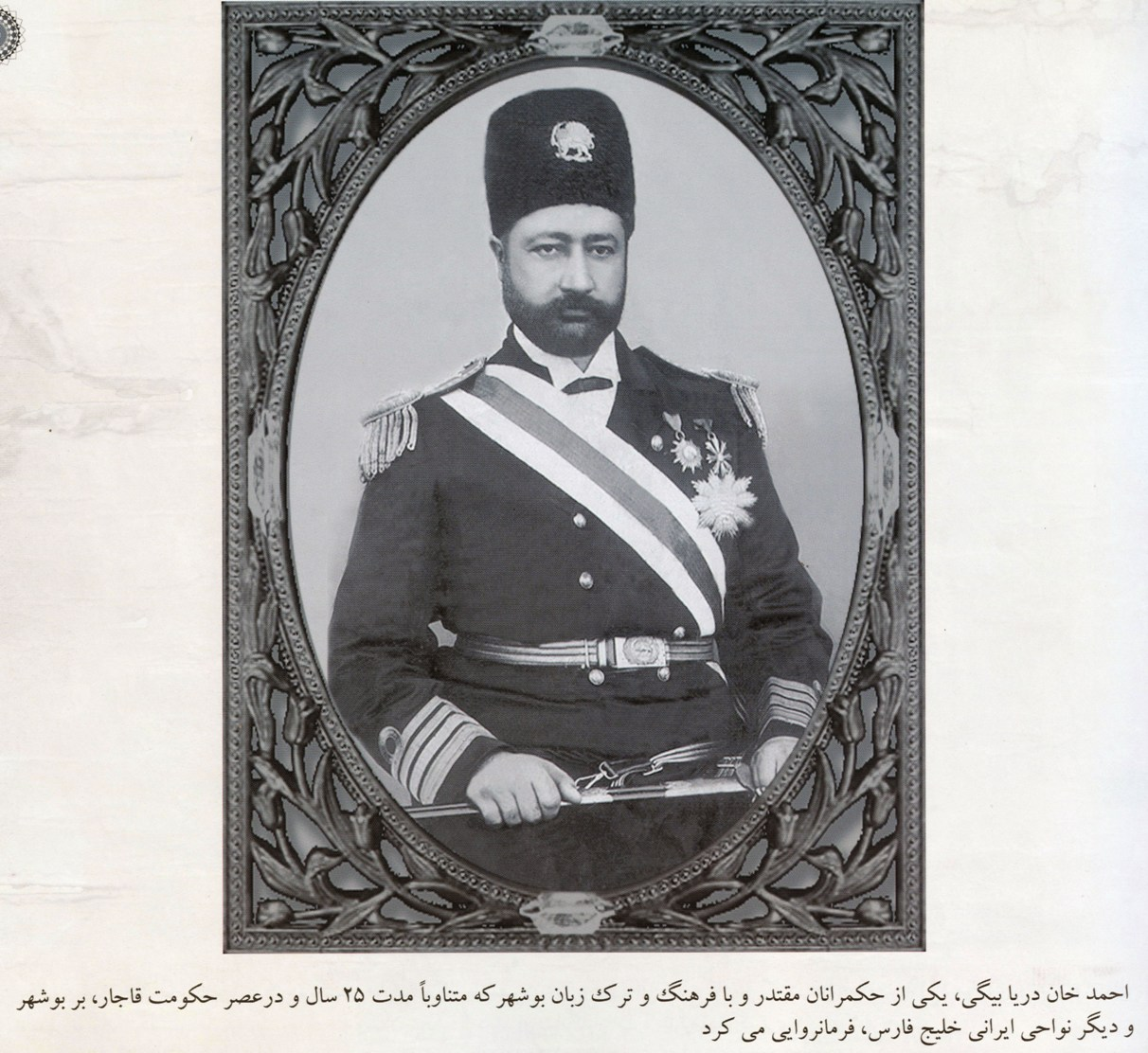
The governor of the Gulf Ports, Ahmad Khan Daryabeigi, who ousted the Qavasem chief Sheikh Mohammad ibn Khalifa from Bandar Lengeh in March 1899

On 4 July 1898, Bandar Lengeh was captured by Sheikh Mohammad ibn Khalifa, the son of a Qavasem sheikh. He was supported by the local merchants and notables. He sent a letter to Amin al-Soltan, pledging to serve as a faithful subject. The governor of the Gulf Ports, Ahmad Khan Daryabeigi, attempted to gain time by sending Sheikh Mohammad a robe of honour alongside an official decree of his appointment as deputy governor of Bandar Lengeh. The state officials in Tehran did not display a negative reaction and preferred to wait for the situation to progress.

On 2 March 1899, a force of 700 soldiers led by Ahmad Khan Daryabeigi attacked Bandar Lengeh. The following day, Sheikh Mohammad and 400 of his men fled. Ahmad Khan Daryabeigi stayed in Bandar Lengeh until 12 July 1899. The subsequent deputy governors of Bandar Lengeh were Ali Reza Khan Gerashi and Hajji Taleb Khan Gerashi, but their dates in office are uncertain.

=== 20th century ===
In March 1903, the office of customs director at Bandar Lengeh was filled for the first time by a Belgian, Lambert Molitor. In 1904, he was replaced by M. Bourgeois. In 1906/07, Ala od-Soltan was the first Iranian to serve as customs director, but was dismissed in September 1907 due to his opposition against the British. Bandar Lengeh was highly impacted by the establishment of the first Iranian Constitution in 1906.

The first kargodhar (agent of the Ministry of Foreign Affairs) of Bandar Lengeh was installed in April 1909. Previously, since at least 1902, the jurisdiction of the kargodhar of Bandar Abbas had also extended to Bandar Lengeh. The Pahlavi dynasty, which had assumed authority in 1925, set up the first police department in Bandar Lengeh in March 1926. In July 1927, the kargodhar office was abolished, making Ali Aqa Mirza Ahmad Khan Ekram ol-Molk the last person in Bandar Lengeh to hold the office.

=== 21st century ===
At around 7 pm on December 28, 2024, a suicide bomber detonated his car near the Bandar Lengeh Intelligence Police building, killing both the suicide bomber and the police chief. Fuad Moradzadeh, the city's governor, denounced the suicide bomber as a terrorist.

In 2025, agricultural exports from Iran through the city's port, mainly destined for the UAE, increased by 21% compared to the past year, but agricultural imports declined by 19%.

In June 2025, the Israeli Defence Forces attacked Iranian warnships docked near the city.

On March 6, 2026, amidst the 2026 Iran war, the United States Navy struck two Shahid Soleimani-class corvettes while they were anchored off the city's coast. From April 5 to 6, 2026, strikes hit both Bandar Lengeh and the nearby city of Kong. At least 6 people were killed and 17 were wounded.

== Demographics ==
=== Language ===
The linguistic composition of the city:

Bandar Lengeh linguistic composition
language	percent
Larestani/Achomi	49.5%
Bandari Persian	20%
Arabic	20%
New Persian	10%
Koroshi	0.5%

=== Population ===
At the time of the 2006 National Census, the city's population was 25,303 in 5,589 households. The following census in 2011 counted 30,478 people in 6,735 households. The 2016 census measured the population of the city as 30,435 people in 8,452 households.

== Climate ==
Bandar Lengeh has a hot desert climate (Köppen climate classification BWh) with hot summers and mild winters. Precipitation is very low, and mostly falls from December to March.

Climate data for Bandar Lengeh (1991–2020, extremes 1966–present)
Month	Jan	Feb	Mar	Apr	May	Jun	Jul	Aug	Sep	Oct	Nov	Dec	Year
Record high °C (°F)	31.6 (88.9)	32.4 (90.3)	36.0 (96.8)	43.4 (110.1)	49.0 (120.2)	49.0 (120.2)	47.0 (116.6)	44.0 (111.2)	44.4 (111.9)	42.5 (108.5)	37.3 (99.1)	32.0 (89.6)	49.0 (120.2)
Mean daily maximum °C (°F)	22.9 (73.2)	24.1 (75.4)	26.8 (80.2)	31.4 (88.5)	35.4 (95.7)	36.8 (98.2)	37.8 (100.0)	37.8 (100.0)	36.3 (97.3)	33.8 (92.8)	29.3 (84.7)	25.0 (77.0)	31.5 (88.7)
Daily mean °C (°F)	18.6 (65.5)	19.8 (67.6)	22.4 (72.3)	26.6 (79.9)	30.5 (86.9)	32.5 (90.5)	34.1 (93.4)	34.2 (93.6)	32.5 (90.5)	29.5 (85.1)	24.9 (76.8)	20.6 (69.1)	27.2 (81.0)
Mean daily minimum °C (°F)	14.5 (58.1)	15.6 (60.1)	18.0 (64.4)	21.8 (71.2)	25.6 (78.1)	28.2 (82.8)	30.6 (87.1)	31.0 (87.8)	28.6 (83.5)	24.8 (76.6)	20.2 (68.4)	16.3 (61.3)	22.9 (73.2)
Record low °C (°F)	6.0 (42.8)	7.0 (44.6)	9.1 (48.4)	10.0 (50.0)	16.0 (60.8)	20.0 (68.0)	22.0 (71.6)	24.0 (75.2)	20.9 (69.6)	17.0 (62.6)	9.0 (48.2)	6.0 (42.8)	6.0 (42.8)
Average precipitation mm (inches)	34.9 (1.37)	19.0 (0.75)	26.4 (1.04)	3.5 (0.14)	0.3 (0.01)	0.1 (0.00)	1.0 (0.04)	0.0 (0.0)	0.1 (0.00)	0.1 (0.00)	12.6 (0.50)	29.4 (1.16)	127.4 (5.02)
Average precipitation days (≥ 1.0 mm)	2.9	1.9	2.6	0.7	0.1	0.0	0.1	0.0	0.0	0.1	1.3	2.3	12.0
Average relative humidity (%)	62.0	62.0	64.0	60.0	61.0	66.0	66.0	66.0	66.0	63.0	58.0	60.0	62.8
Average dew point °C (°F)	11.0 (51.8)	12.4 (54.3)	15.2 (59.4)	18.1 (64.6)	21.6 (70.9)	25.4 (77.7)	27.2 (81.0)	27.2 (81.0)	25.5 (77.9)	21.7 (71.1)	15.9 (60.6)	12.4 (54.3)	19.5 (67.1)
Mean monthly sunshine hours	243.0	228.0	241.0	267.0	322.0	321.0	293.0	289.0	275.0	291.0	258.0	246.0	3,274
Source: NOAA

== Gallery ==
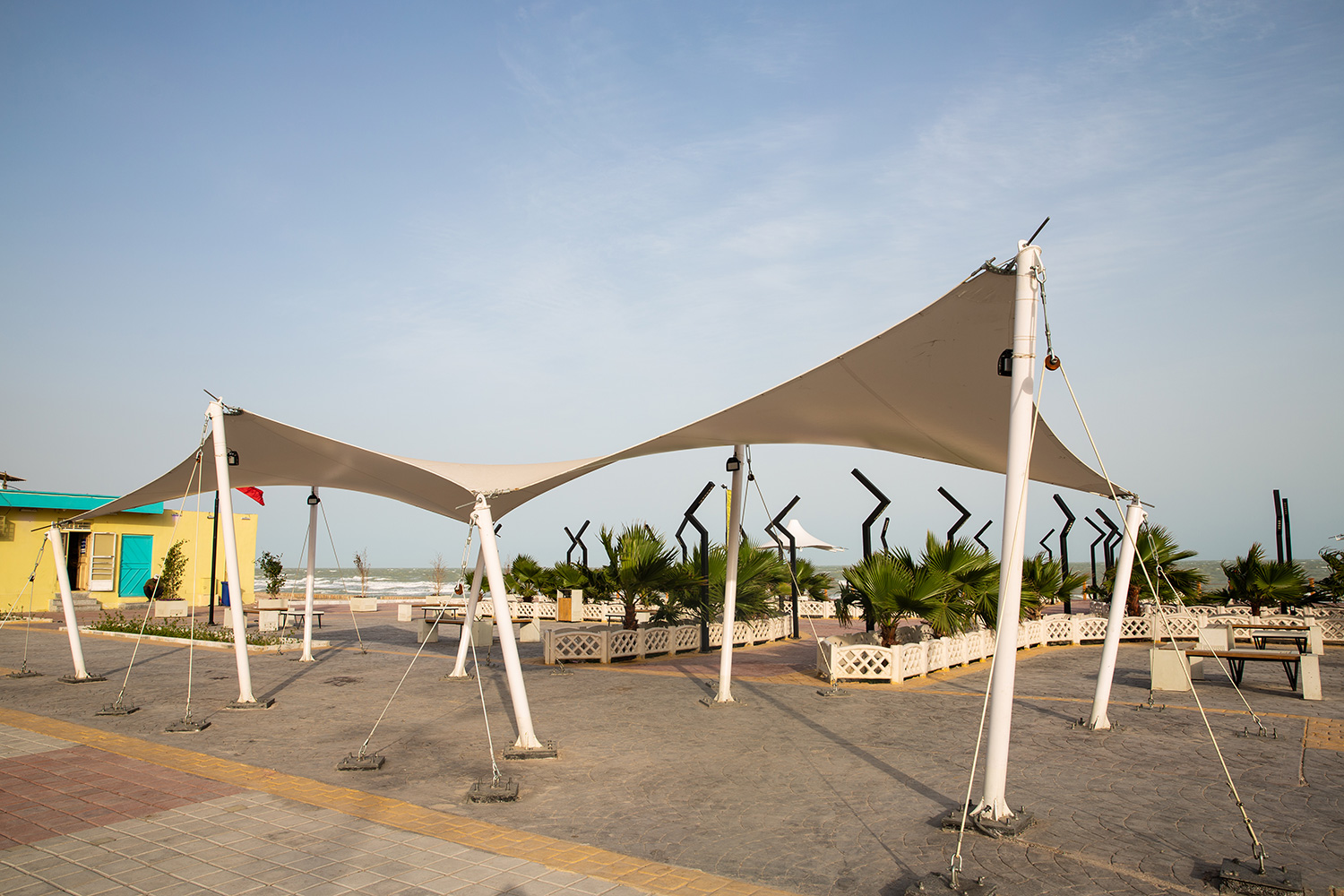

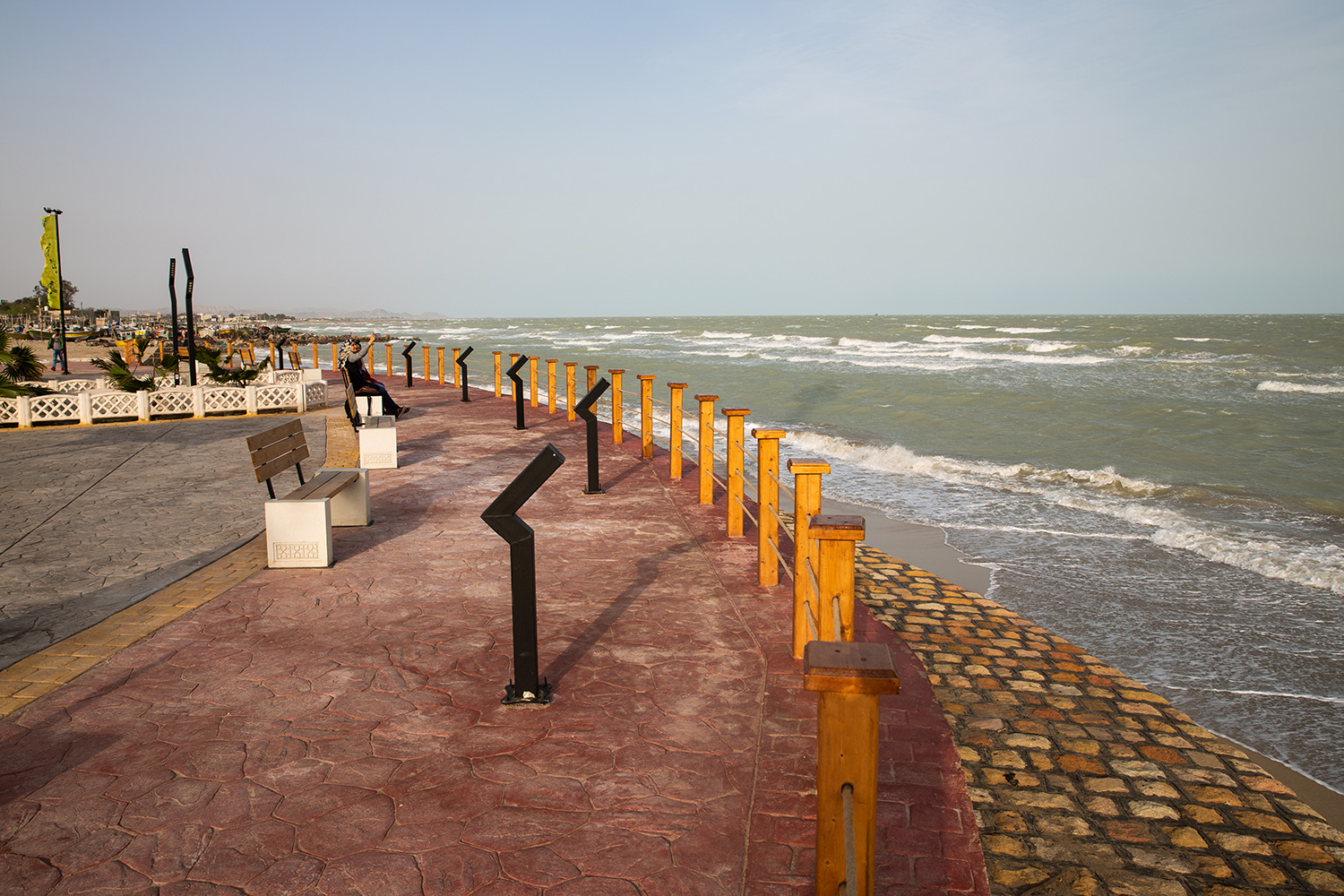

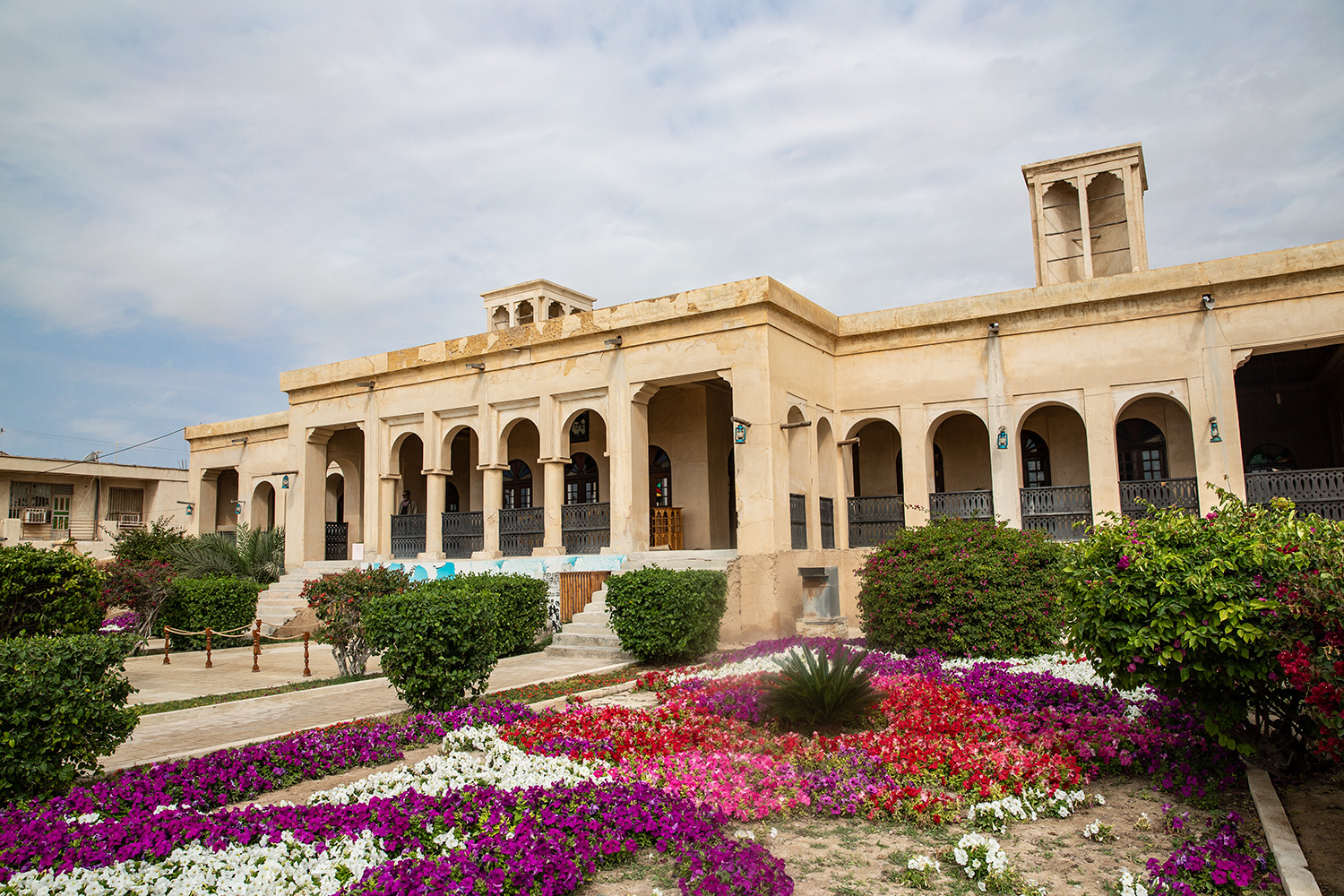

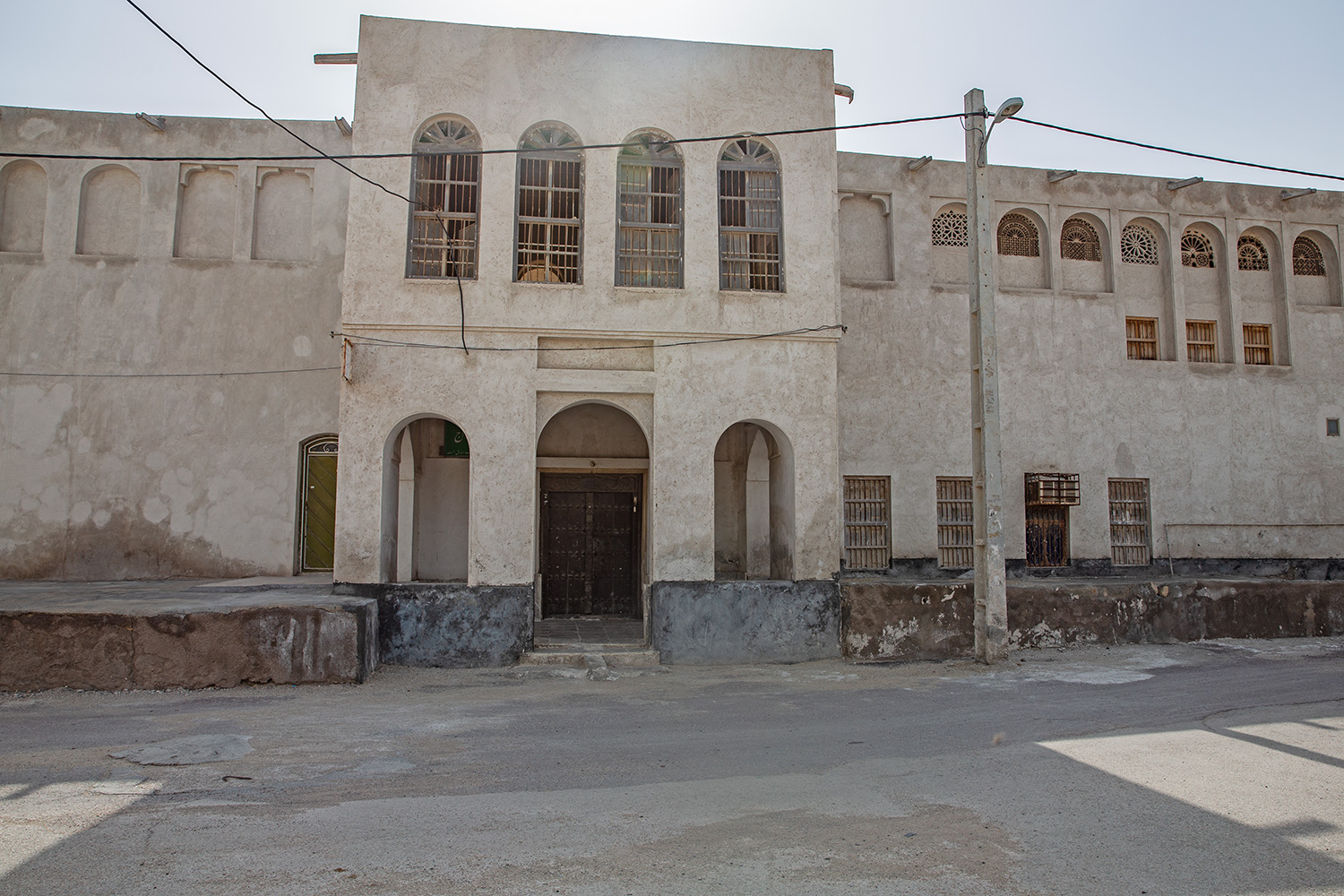

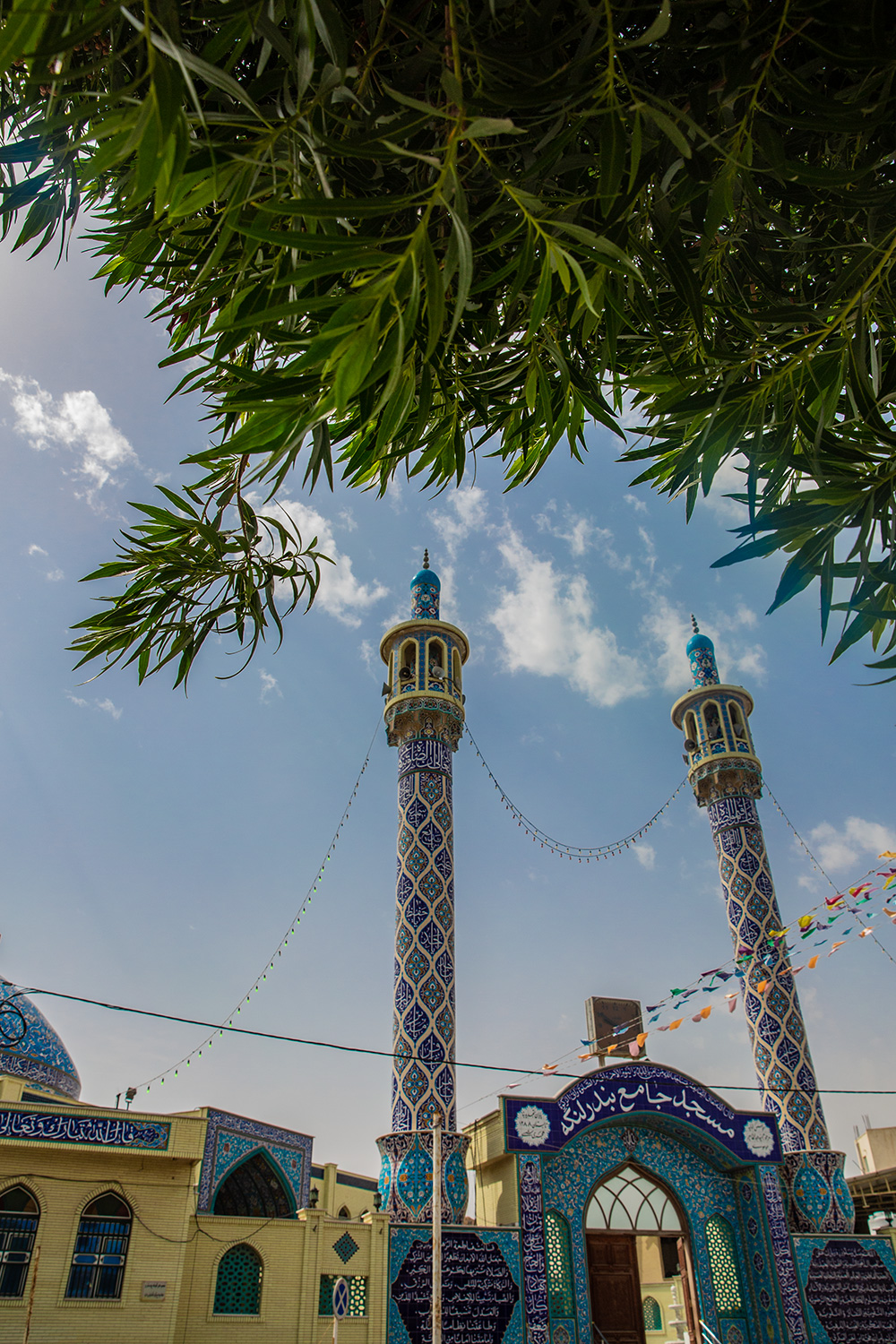

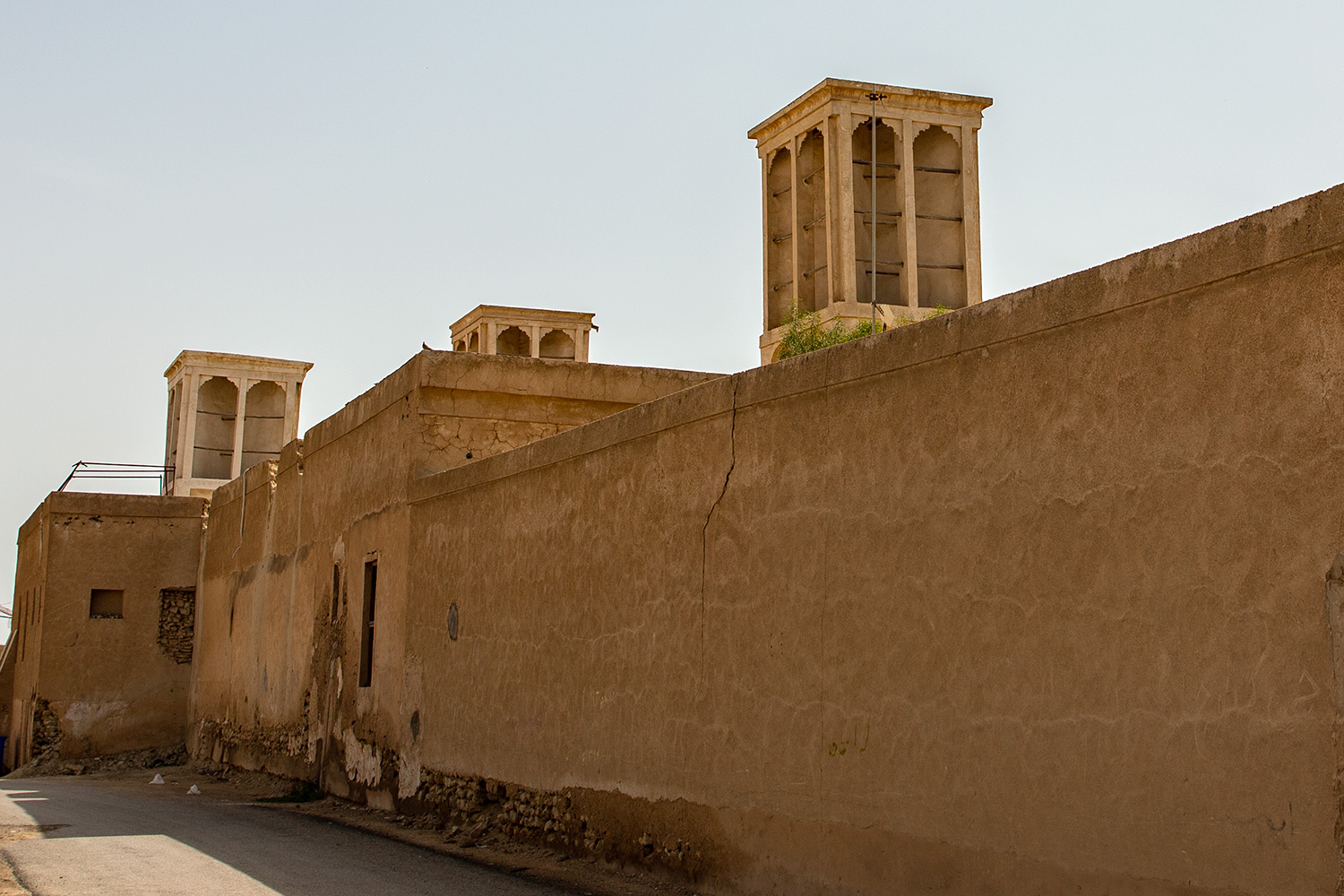

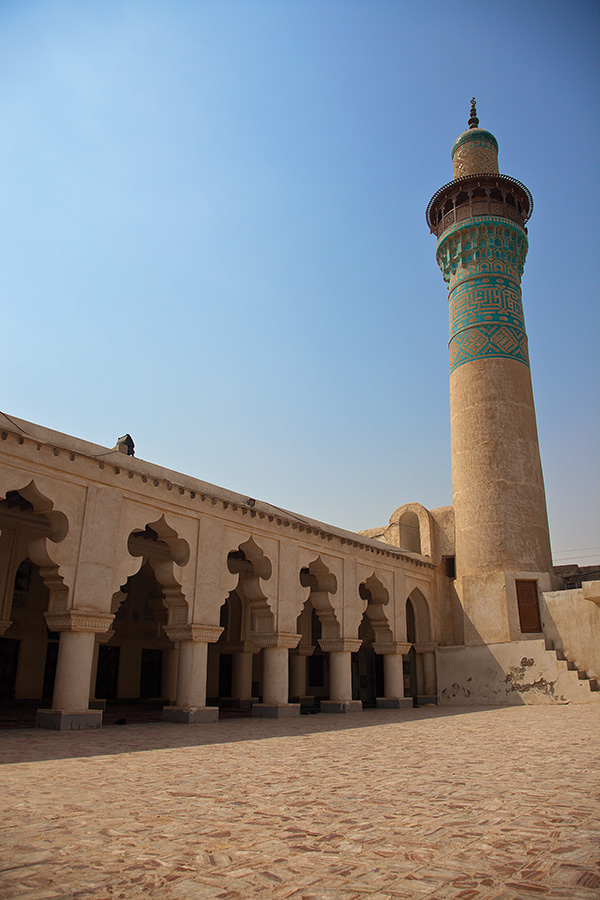

== See also ==
- Al Qasimi
- Kookherd
- Bastak
- Morbagh
- Maghoh
- Media related to Bandar Lengeh at Wikimedia Commons

== Sources ==
- Floor, Willem (2010). The Persian Gulf: The Rise and Fall of Bandar-e Lengeh, The Distribution Center for the Arabian Coast, 1750-1930. Mage Publishers. ISBN 978-1933823393.
