= Miladian dynasty =

Medieval Iranian dynasty based at Lar

Miladian Dynasty میلادیان
- Capital: Lar
- Ethnic groups: Achomi people
- Government: Sultanate
  - Vali: Ebrahim Khan II
- Currency: Lari
Succeeded by
Safavid Iran
- Today part of: Iran

The Miladian dynasty was a local Persian (Laristani) Sunni Muslim dynasty that ruled Laristan during the Medieval Ages. It traced its origins to Gorgin Milad, a descendant of the cycle of the legendary Kayanid Kay Khosrow.

It encompassed much of Laristan and the Garmsirat. The final stop under Hormuzi administration on the caravan route from Hormuz to Laristan was the village of Kawrestan. The two kingdoms neighboured.

== Political Developments ==
The first Lari prince to convert to Islam, Jalal al-Din Iradj, converted around 100 A.H, (718–19). Dates regarding early Laristan are unclear, but they become more so from the time of Qutb al-Din Muaiyid Pakuy (594–648 A.H, or 1197–8 to 1250–51). Fourteen of his successors are known, but the order in which they came is also unclear.

When Ibn Battuta passed through Lar in 1347, it was ruled by a certain Jalal al-Din, a Turkoman. However, according to the genealogy of the Miladians, a certain Bakalindjar II ruled at the time (731–753 A.H, 1330–31 until 1352–53). The Lar princes are shown to have been dependent on the Muzaffarids, displayed on a coin minted in the reign of Shah Shuja (760–786 A.H, or 1358–59 until 1384–85).

In 799 A.H (1396–97,) the troops of Muhammad Sultan, grandson of Timur, ravaged eastern Fars along the lines of Karzin-Fal, Lar-Jahrom, etc. Subsequently, there were Timurid and Chagatayid coins struck at Lar.

Afansii Nikitin, a Russian merchant, passed through Lar in 1469 and 1472, during the reign of Jahan Shah (859–883 A.H, or 1454–55 until 1478–79).

Prior to the advent of the Safavids, Laristan as usual interfered in Hormuz’s affairs. In 1498, the ruler of Lar attempted to exploit internal strife within Hormuz to seize the island emporium. Jolfar was in revolt, and karavansalar Abu Bakr Lari was sent to Jarun, with 60 vessels, and troops. The expedition, unfortunately for him, proved unsuccessful. Lari was killed, and his head sent to the governor of Shiraz.

As Hormuz’s internal issues continued, Laristan found it opportune to intervene once more in 1505, and the kingdom landed troops on Qeshm, where their troops were defeated by the royal guard.

=== Laristan in Safavid times ===
Laristan’s rulers began to acknowledge the suzerainty of Isma’il I in 1508-9, along with the Kings of Hormuz, though they still remained autonomous and Laristan even had its own coinage, the lari, which was the preferred currency in the Persian Gulf from the 15th into the 17th century. Amir Huran of Lar was even nominated amir-divan, though neither Hormuz nor Laristan were directly incorporated into the empire. His successors, and even some post-annexation Safavid governors received the title of divanbegi-bashi or chief of the judiciary.

The local ruler had the title of vali in Safavid times and considered himself equal to the governor-general of Fars. Membré, a Venetian envoy, writes that in 1540 that “their King there is King Soprassi, but he is a vassal of the Sophy… The said King wears the Sophy’s cap.”

Despite Lar’s significant economic growth, the rulers of the kingdom never gave up hopes on taking the island of Hormuz for themselves. Among other reasons, Hormuz’s decline in the period was indeed partially brought by Laristan’s desire to attain sea access independent from the Portuguese-controlled coastal thalassocracy in the 1540s. In 1508, the Lari ruler once more attempted to invade Hormuz, counting on the assistance of Jolfar’s vessels, of which there were always fishing and merchant vessels able to be used for the transportation of troops. In 1511, the Lari vassal, the Emir of Arman, Rashed, attacked Lashtan and caused much upheaval in the region; they also attacked Tezerg fort with 4,000 arquebusiers and blocked traffic. Following the Portuguese 1507 treaty between themselves and the local Kingdom of Hormuz, which stipulated vassalage, two Safavid ambassadors appeared on the border with Hormuz, sent from Shiraz, seeking on behalf of the Shah the annual moqarrariyeh the Kings of Hormuz traditionally paid to the rulers of Lar. The local Portuguese under Albuquerque thought of this payment as tribute, when the locals thought of it as solely commercial, leading to a misunderstanding as the Portuguese refused to pay.

Amir Nushirvan “the just”, ruling between 1524–1542, was a poet, musician, and author. He died at the hands of a fida’i, and Ebrahim Khan, his successor, also submitted to the Safavids and was granted the title of amir-divan. Also in his reign, Tahmasp I made the contemporary emir of Laristan, Ebrahim, his divan-begi, one of the most significant offices in the state.

In 1532, amidst further trouble internally in Hormuz, Laristan attacked various coastal settlements, but to no lasting effect. Around a decade later in 1543, amidst conflict in Moghestan, the area of Moghestan was given to the governor of Lar by Tahmasp, which conflicted with Portuguese interests, as the area was part of Hormuz. While previous attempts didn’t manage to take Lashtan, the strongest Lari subject, the Emir of Ilud, spearheaded the drive south in 1546, blocking caravans, marching to face the island of Hormuz along with other coastal emirs, and finally taking over Lashtan Castle. The matter seemingly was settled in July 1547, between Coge Moguor [?] and Ebrahim of Lar. At the time, Tahmasp I found himself in Hormuz, and he found it in his best interests to end the conflict, as he considered himself overlord over both parties, and their conflict harmed trade in the region.

In the early 16th century, the Gulf lost one of its great pearl fisheries, driving a group of Huwala Arabs called the Niquilus, i.e. those of (Bandar-e) Nakhilu to contribute to the issues plaguing the region. They were forced to compete with the Alimoeiros, as noted by the Portuguese, who drove them out of Oman. They then went to Larek, before turning to Nakhilu, allowed by the governor of Lar to remain there.

In 1573, during the waning of the Portuguese-Ottoman conflict in the Gulf, the Portuguese sailed to Bahrain and captured the Lari envoy on the island. It can be inferred from Newberie’s 1578 writings that Bendel around this time and following the 1574 death of Tahmasp and subsequent insecurity in Persia that the Portuguese had to defend the fortifications from various Lari attacks.

Amir Ebrahim’s son, Nur al-Din ruled as a contemporary of Sultan Muhammad Khudabanda.

Allegedly, an incident (not reported in Persian sources) occurred in 1581, when the “Khan of Hurmuz” supposedly perished (which did not occur) and his heir was his sister, married to the khan of Lar. The latter subsequently invaded and occupied several coastal settlements including Shamil, before the Portuguese defeated and drove him out. (Note: This was reported by Simon de Moraes. Look to the note in Floor 2006, p.197.)

In 1588, Austrian traveller Hans Christoph von Teufel passing through Lar observed a substantial pillar of heads of Portuguese who had died in a battle two years prior. However, such a battle is not mentioned in neither Persian nor Portuguese sources. The heads were also very much unlikely to be Portuguese, and so Teufel’s informant probably thought it more interesting to identify them as Portuguese.

Under Shah ‘Abbas, Nur al-Din’s son, Mirza ‘Ala al-Molk was allowed to take the regnal title of Ebrahim Khan II, and he began showing signs of independence. Ebrahim Khan began oppressing the transit trade in 1597, after one of Laristan’s subjects had been converted to Christianity, the matter however soon being settled. Therefore, the dynasty was invaded and conquered by Safavid invasions led by Allahverdi Khan in 1601-2, following Ebrahim Khan II’s supposed treacherous behaviour to the former regarding the collection of illegal commercial taxes, as part of Shah ‘Abbas’s centralisation efforts. Ebrahim Khan was besieged in a fort outside of Lar, and died of diarrhoea after some time besieged. Thus, the area was from then administrated directly as part of Safavid Iran.

Then, to show that Laristan was no longer autonomous, and that the jurisdiction was no longer independent, its new governor received a robe of honour from his superior, governor-general of Fars, of which Molla Jalal noted that it had “never been the rule that the governor of Lar would don a robe of honour from the governor of Fars.” Lar would later on constitute khasseh land, or crownland.

=== Lar and its mercantile significance ===
By the end of the 14th century, Laristan had developed an alternative route from the Bandel de Camorão so that it passed through Lar. Seemingly, custom duties remained consistent, but increased caravan activity brought increased growth of economic activity, which was taxed, to Laristan. Subsequently, Laristan’s revenues increased. Merchants also settled in Lar and participated in the coastal commerce.

Possibly, their rulers benefited trade-wise from the 1504 massacre of Kazeruni hatibs at the behest of the first Safavid Shah, Isma’il. Lodges of the order had proved useful as a regional backbone for trade, offering crediting facilities, though the Safavids may have viewed them as a threat to their religious policy. Whatever the motivations, Kazerun as a city was found as a shell of its former self by its 17th century observers.

The city of Lar also had a Jewish community, described in 1523 as “poor people, native to the same land” by A. Tenreiro, however, they grew in wealth and number in the first half of the 16th century due to the influx of their co-religionists, Sephardic Jews, attracted via Hormuz. With them came commercial contacts and brought Lar the reputation of a seat of wealthy merchants. In the course of the 17th century, however, important sections of this community moved to the new Safavid capital, Isfahan.

The Portuguese had always purchased their sulphur from Lar, where a Jewish merchant named Shmuel had a quasi-monopoly over the resource. His family had established themselves in the region between 1533-36. By December 1545, the usual supplier had reached his capacity, encouraging the Portuguese to look to the business of an Armenian, and others, who cut production and raised prices, which indeed doubled.

According to Le Bruyn, Lar was the town where “the best cannons in all Persia are cast.”

== Contact with China ==
Although it does not appear in any official historical records, a Ming dynasty imperial edict written in both Chinese and Mongolian scripts, currently housed in Turkey's Topkapı Palace Museum, reveals a possible encounter between the Miladian dynasty and the Ming dynasty.

The edict records that in 1453, the Ming emperor rewarded Mielierji 咩力爾吉 (written as Yanglirgi in the Mongolian version), the leader of the Lar region, with silk fabrics in return for his presentation of tribute to China.

It remains unclear exactly when the Ottoman Empire acquired this edict, but it was kept in the collections of the Topkapı Palace until the mid-20th century, when it was discovered and brought to light by the Turkish scholar Tahsin Öz. The contents of both scripts were subsequently deciphered and interpreted by the Sinologist Wolfram Eberhard and the Mongolist Francis Woodman Cleaves.
