= Latif Khan =

Persian admiral (18th century)

- لطیف خان

Daryabegi (Admiral) of the Afsharid navy
- In office 1734–?
- Monarch: Nader Shah

Military service
- Allegiance: Afsharid Iran
- Branch/service: Afsharid navy
- Rank: Admiral
- Battles/wars: Afsharid conquests in the Persian Gulf and Oman

Latif Khan (Persian: لطیف خان) was an 18th century Afsharid daryabeigi (admiral) who served as a subordinate to the provincial governor Mohammad Taqi Khan Shirazi.

Few sources provide substantial information about his rule, albeit he was promoted to admiral in 1734 where he struggled to acquire ships; this was improvised by using borrowed vessels, with which Latif suffered a defeat to an Ottoman fleet near Basra in 1735.

Following the events of Nader Shah's coup and proclamation of the Afsharid dynasty, Latif began a second expedition in the Persian Gulf; he skirmished with and defeated the Omani navy near Bahrain and captured it.

Latif was described as having a "strong-willed" and distinguishable character as described by the Dutch East India Company.

At some point during his career as admiral, Latif was the chief logistician and commander of the Afsharid fleet and was highly regarded for his exception skill and knowledge of the warfare attributed to him.

Ostensibly to aid the Sultan of Oman in quelling a rebellion in their homeland, he led his fleet, which he harnessed with the help of Arab sailors, and crushed this revolt. Latif however had no intention of stopping there; he occupied Muscat with 5,000 troops and effectively placed Oman under his suzerainty by 1738.

In 1737–38, after a series of quarrels between Latif Khan and Taqi Khan Shirazi, the latter poisoned the former. Latif Khan ended up leaving behind a token fleet which would supplement Afsharid interests in the Persian Gulf for the coming years. Nonetheless, no major endeavor to subdue the Persian Gulf took place until 1740–43, and his death was a major setback.
