= Mohammad Naser Khan Lari =

Beglerbegi

Governor of Larestan
- In office 1748–1765
- Monarchs: Ismail III, Karim Khan Zand
- Preceded by: Mirza Abotaleb Kalantar
- Succeeded by: Maseh Khan Kali

Mohammad Naser Khan Lari was an 18th century Iranian warlord and statesman who ruled the southern part of the Fars province from 1748 to 1765.

== Biography ==
=== Background and rise ===
Mohammad Naser Khan Lari's original name was Mir Shokr Naser. He claimed descent from the Miladian dynasty of Lar whose rule was abolished by Shah Abbas I (r. 1587–1629). During the political turmoil that followed the Afghan invasion and Nader's rise to power, Mir Shokr Naser partnered with his older brother, Mir Shokr Hajji, to establish their rule. From their base in Kal to the south of Lar, they captured a mountain fort in the northern Sab'a region. Through structured banditry, they quickly gained authority over the entire Sab'a. Their governorship was approved by Nader Shah (r. 1736–1747), who gave them the title of khan.

=== Struggle for power ===
Following the death of Nader Shah in 1747, central authority collapsed, leading to the rise of several contenders. The southern part of the Fars province held significant strategic value because it connected Shiraz with the major ports of Bandar Lengeh, Bandar Kong, and Bandar Abbas. A lack of central government authority in this area enabled regional leaders to expand their power significantly.

In Lar, Mirza Abotaleb Kalantar came to power after rebelling and killing the local governor, Mir Mohammad Taqi. Naser Khan and his brother Haji Khan were subsequently asked by Mir Mohammad Taqi's wife Jahanbanu to help avenge his death. The two brothers traveled to Lar and killed Mirza Abotaleb Kalantar, marking the start of governance by the Naser Khani family over Larestan from 1748. In the spring of 1750, the two brothers led an army of several thousand musketeers to seize Shiraz from Saleh Khan Bayat. The city was in an unstable situation, as it had in the previous year been attacked by Fath-Ali Khan. Saleh Khan Bayat defeated the two brothers, leading to the death of Haji Khan and imprisonment of Naser Khan. This event happened around the same time as Ali Mardan Khan Bakhtiari undertook a military campaign into Fars, which soon led to his conquest of Shiraz. Naser Khan escaped prison afterwards and returned to Lar.

During the four years that followed, Naser Khan formed an army numbering between fifteen and sixteen thousand troops and expanded his domain along the Persian Gulf. The British East India Company's trading post at Bandar Abbas paid him a high price for his protection, earning him the affectionate nickname "our Caun". He was also given tribute by Arab sheikhs based in various ports.

In March or April 1765, under the orders of Karim Khan Zand (r. 1751–1779), Sadeq Khan Zand besieged Lar to arrest Naser Khan. In early May, Naser Khan's cousin Maseh Khan Kali betrayed him and opened the besieged fortress for the Zands. Naser Khan was subsequently imprisoned in Shiraz, while Maseh Khan was rewarded with the governorship of Larestan and Bandar Abbas.

== Sources ==
- Ahmadlu, R.; Razanhan, M. H.; Razavi, S. A.; Changizi, E. (2024). "Nasir Khan Lari Family and the Rise of the Qajar Dynasty". Historical Sciences Studies. 16 (1): 1–24. doi:10.22059/jhss.2024.378116.473727.
- Perry, John R. (1979). Karim Khan Zand: A History of Iran, 1747–1779. University of Chicago Press. ISBN 978-0226660981.
- Ricks, Thomas M. (2012). Notables, Merchants, and Shaykhs of Southern Iran and Its Ports: Politics and Trade in the Persian Gulf, AD 1729-1789. Gorgias Press. ISBN 978-1463216405.
