= Malek bin Abbas Mosque =

Mosque in Bandar Lengeh, Hormozgan, Iran

- مسجد ملک بن عباس
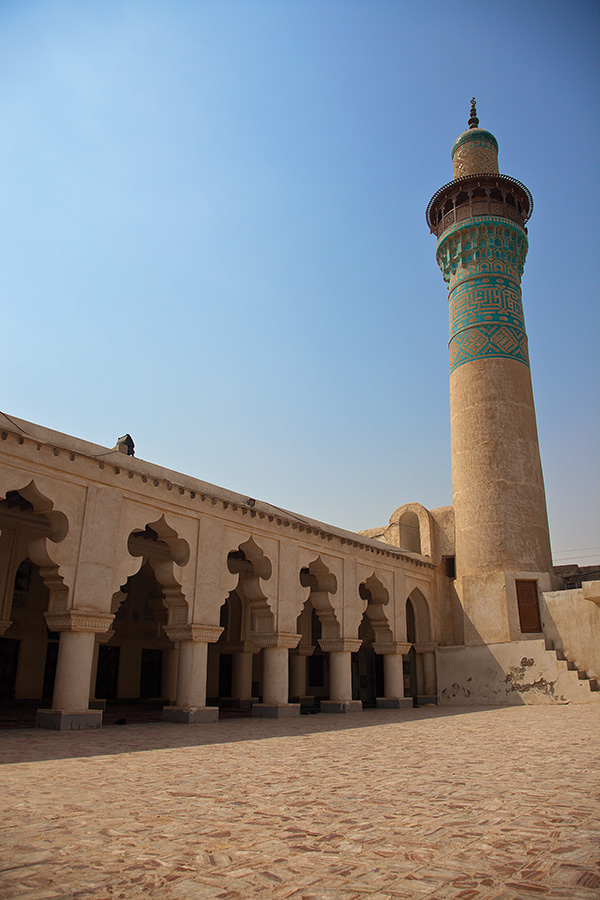
- The mosque minaret, in 2009

- Location of the mosque in Iran

Religion
- Affiliation: Sunni Islam
- Ecclesiastical or organizational status: Mosque
- Status: Active

Location
- Location: Bandar Lengeh, Hormozgan
- Country: Iran
- Interactive map of Malek bin Abbas Mosque
- Coordinates: 26°32′57″N 54°52′48″E

Architecture
- Type: Mosque architecture
- Style: Timurid
- Completed: Timurid era
- Minaret: One

Iran National Heritage List
- Official name: Malek bin Abbas Mosque
- Type: Built
- Designated: 7 May 1975
- Reference no.: 1063
- Conservation organization: Cultural Heritage, Handicrafts and Tourism Organization of Iran

The Malek bin Abbas Mosque (Persian: مسجد ملک بن عباس; Arabic: مسجد ملك بن عباس) is a Sunni mosque located in Bandar Lengeh, in the province of Hormozgan in southern Iran. The mosque was completed during the Timurid era.

The mosque was added to the Iran National Heritage List on 7 May 1975, administered by the Cultural Heritage, Handicrafts and Tourism Organization of Iran.

== See also ==
- Islam in Iran
- List of mosques in Iran
