= Shahrokh Khan Afshar =

18th century Persian statesman

- شاهرخ خان افشار

Governor of Kerman

Wāli Beglerbegi Sardar
- In office 1747–1760
- Appointed by: Shahrokh Shah (formally)
- Monarchs: Adel Shah; Shahrokh Shah
- Preceded by: Mo'men Khan Bafqi
- Succeeded by: Taqi Khan Bami

Personal details
- Died: 20 September 1760 Bafq, Behabad or Bahramabad
- Children: Lutf Ali Khan
- Parent: Esma'il Khan Afshar

Shahrokh Khan Afshar (Persian: شاهرخ خان افشار, romanized: Šāhroḫ Ḫān Afšār; d. 20 September 1760) was an 18th century Iranian warlord, statesman and general who ruled in Kerman starting in 1747 during the internecine succession struggles upon the death of Nader Shah. His dynasty's rule was ephemeral and his land was absorbed by the Zands upon his death.

Shahrokh began his career after seizing control of Kerman in 1747 from its former governor. From there, he waged a series of conflicts in order to secure control over the region of Kerman, driving out marauding Balochis from Sistan and extending his rule to Yazd and Abarkuh. In spite of a revolt in Yazd headed by Taqi Khan Bafqi in 1756, and the city's occupation by the Zand dynasty in 1758, Shahrokh recaptured it two years later and re-asserted his control. He was later killed on 20 September 1760 in an uprising, which put an end to his rule.

He leveraged the lucrative wool industry and maintained cordial relations with the VOC and the British East India Company. He was able to rebuild the city of Kerman that had been subject to destruction and depletion by Nader Shah and the Hotaks who preceded his dynasty.

== Career ==
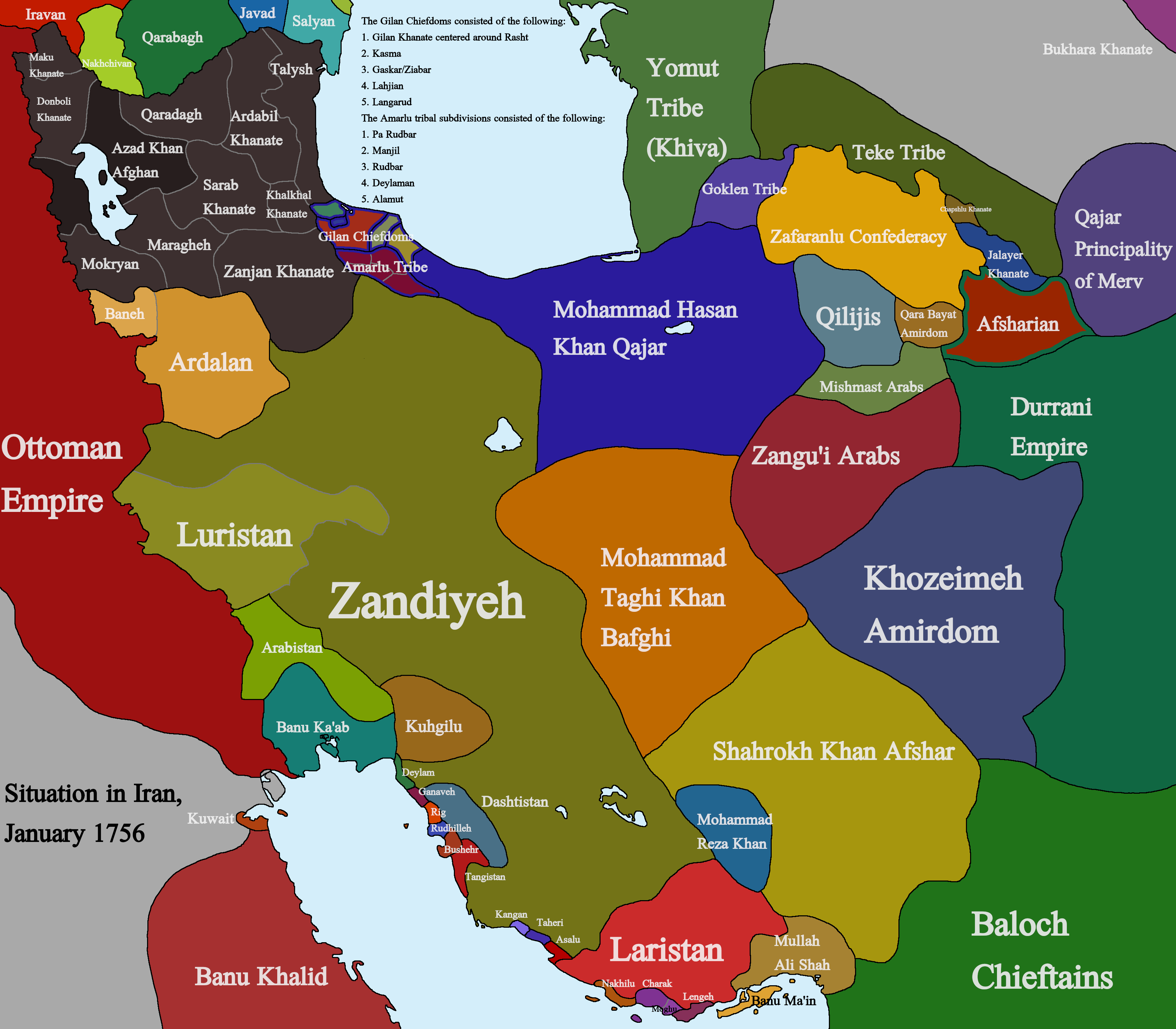
Map of Iran in 1756

Shahrokh Khan Afshar was a notable in the vicinity of Kerman and the son to Esma'il Khan Afshar, who was the grandson of Vali Khan, the city's governor under Abbas the Great. In 1747, Shahrokh Khan managed to depose governor Mo'men Khan Bafqi and seize control over Kerman and the surrounding areas including Yazd and Abarkuh. It was then subject to the depredations of 15,000 Afghans and Tatars that October; they scalled the walls and pillaged the Zoroastrian quarter for the next 6 days, resulting in a deadly famine. This was compounded by another raid by a small band of Afghans under Allah Yar Khan. Shahrokh successfully received recognition from Shahrokh Shah, Nader Shah's successor in Mashhad. Shahrokh Khan, in spite of demands from the Shah, and the reception of a diploma, often refused to pay tax during his early rule due to the devastation incurred by incessant raiding.

In 1749, Shahrokh Khan was effectively a vassal of Saleh Khan Bayat who based himself in Shiraz, and the latter issued a raqam that removed Shah Qoli Khan from the position of beglerbegi of Kerman, a title that was likely assumed by Shahrokh himself afterwards. Further legitimacy was gained from Ahmad Shah Durrani, who confirmed him in his post as beglerbegi; Shahrokh was compelled to hastily acquire 1,000 tomans as a gift to Ahmad's court.

In Summer 1750, a coup ousted sardar Mohammad Reza Beg, giving Shahrokh Khan total authority over the Kerman area. In 1751, he defeated an army of Balochis and Sistanis at Chehel Tokhm a mile outside of Bam, taking their animals and weaponry as loot. In 1752, he was reconfirmed and received robes of honor (khal'ats) and a seal of confirmation (manšur). In 1754, he invited Nasir Khan of Lar to assist him in countering raids by the deposed Mo'men Khan Bafqi, but the former imprisoned him in a banquet and attacked Kerman. However, Shahrokh managed to escape by paying the guards a ransom of 10,000 tomans and forced Nasir Khan to retreat. Nevertheless, his unpopularity resulted in an insurrection by the mostawfi of Yazd, Taqi Khan Bafqi, who captured the city successfully.

Shahrokh Khan soon endeavored to secure his control over the adjcents of Kerman; he seized Fort Korrani in December 1754 and captured Hajji Mohammad Sirjani. This later prompted a campaign from August-December 1755 upon a raid by Mohammad Reza Khan wherein he skirmished with the Sirjani forces in Barsir and Rafsanjan, before unsuccessfully besieging Mimnad. A settlement was reached where Reza Khan would pay tribute and both sides would relent from further conflict.

In March 1756, he left Kerman with 2,000 and attacked his relative Zaynal Soltan who had instigated Lashani tribal raids on his land. Shahrokh defeated Zaynal at Dashtbar between mid-March and June 1756 and besieged Hajjiabad on 4 May 1756, forcing Zaynal to agree on better relations and return some goods and hostages. The two cooperated in ousting Mohammad Reza Khan from Sirjan in 1758, and Zaynal inflicted a defeat on the former in May that year near Issin. Reza Khan was sent to Jiroft and in 1757, a reconciliation was made with Taqi Khan Bami.

== Death ==
In September 1758, Karim Khan Zand occupied Yazd, but Shahrokh Khan captured it for himself on 13 April 1760. He finally ousted Taqi Khan Bafqi, who had proclaimed his hometown of Bafq as independent from Shahrokh, and installed Morad Ali Beg as the governor of Yazd. In June 1760, the Zands dispatched Khoda Morad Khan Zand with 5,000 to invade Shahrokh's domains. Resultingly, Shahrokh awaited the enemy forces at Anar, but encountered resistance at the fortress of Bahramabad; while besieging it, he died on 20 September 1760. (Note: Encyclopaedia Iranica disputes this and writes that he was killed in 1758.) (Note: Perry claims he died while besieging Behabad.)Taqi Khan Bami succeeded him, but was subject to the Zand conquest shortly afterward.

== Religion ==
Toward the end of Nader Shah's reign, the Nizari Hasan ibn Ali moved to Shahr-i-Babak for his summer residence, which came under Shahrokh Khan's rule. Shahrokh treated the imam well, and allowed him to use the location as a means of proximity to his followers who largely did pilgrimage from India. Hasan gathered large properties in Shahr-i-Babak, and was consequential enough to betroth his daughter to Shahrokh Khan's son, Lutf Ali Khan. His winter residence was Kerman itsself, and he became the region's beglerbegi shortly after the Zand conquest.

== Policies ==
=== Coinage ===
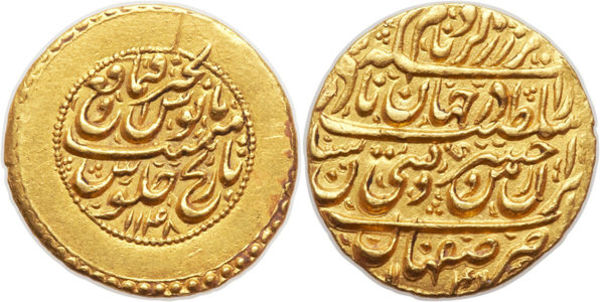
Ashrafi Naderi coin, minted in Isfahan.

During the interregnum after Nader Shah's death, coinage was scarce because the treasury had been heavily depleted by military expenditures. This crisis too existed in Kerman and southern Iranian rulers (especially after 1754) issued mostly copper coins with some gold and silver, which differed from the 4.6g Abbasi and 11.5g Naderi which were being issued in the Afsharid-controlled territory near Mashhad. The scarcity of currency met its worst when the Dutch VOC could not find coins to pay for its daily expenses in Kerman; bartering was also a common practice.

=== Trade and relations with Europe ===
Shahrokh was able to revive the economy of Kerman, which was reduced to cannibalism in some cases in 1748, by the means of external trade, an effort aided by the noble family of Khandan Quli Beg. By mid-1749, an average of two large caravans were leaving Kerman for Bandar Abbas to facilitate trade. Shahrokh was able to alleviate the famine somewhat by Spring of 1750; Kerman became a leading wool (kirk) exporter with over 30,000lbs being produced annually. However, as a result of the depredations of Balochi raiders, harvests declined before resurfacing in the years after 1755.

Throughout 1750-1, the security of the roads between Kerman and Mashhad declined. However, when the Afghans under Ahmad Shah Durrani were expelled from Nishapur, trade was re-opened and the Banians of Bandar Abbas sent goods to Kerman again. By 1757, trade was heavily stabilized and wool production grew yet again, being exported in large quantities to Europe via the VOC and EIC. This period, which ended in 1763, was marked by urban growth, an increased number of artisans, and higher caravan traffic.

=== Architecture ===
During his tenure as governor, a garden called Bagh-e Shahrokh Khan was constructed and appeared during the Zand siege of Kerman in 1766.

== Legacy ==
By the time of Shahrokh's death, Kerman and the surrounding areas had been unified under one sphere of influence. The country heavily increased its reliance on foreign trade and almost fully recovered from the exactions of Nader Shah early in his rule. Once Shahrokh died in 1760, he was succeeded by Taqi Khan Bami, who lost the city shortly after to the Zand commander Khoda Morad Khan. Kerman would be seized and contested by multiple different rulers over the next decades, but was eventually conquered and sacked by Agha Mohammad Khan Qajar in 1794.

== See also ==
- Karim Khan Zand
- Agha Mohammad Khan Qajar
- Kerman
- Shahrokh Shah Afshar
- Division of the Afsharid Empire
