= Moḥammad Taqi Khan Shirazi's Rebellion =

1744 military revolt

Rebellion of 1744
- Part of Nader's Campaigns
Date	January–June 1744
Location	Fārs province, southern Persia
Result	Rebellion quelled
Territorial changes	Fārs province ravaged and brought under control. Shiraz sacked.

Belligerents
Afsharid Empire	Persian rebels

Commanders and leaders
Nader Shah	Mohammad Taqi Khan Shirazi (surrendered)

Nāder's loss of prestige in the Dagestan campaign and his ongoing war with the Ottomans caused several domestic rebellions. The most serious of these began near Shiraz in January 1744 and was led by Moḥammad Taqi Khan Shirazi, the commander of Fārs province and one of Nāder’s favorites. In June 1744, Nāder sacked Shiraz, and by winter he had crushed these revolts with extreme force. Since Nader had taken an oath to never kill Taqi Khan, he was tortured and mutilated instead: he was castrated and an eye was torn out, then his brother, sons and friends were executed in front of him, and then his wife was raped in front of him by Nader's soldiers.

== See also ==
- Afsharid dynasty
- Safavid dynasty
- Shiraz
- Nader Shah

== Sources ==
- Michael Axworthy, The Sword of Persia: Nader Shah, from Tribal Warrior to Conquering Tyrant Hardcover 348 pages (26 July 2006) Publisher: I.B. Tauris Language: English ISBN 1-85043-706-8
