= Mohammad Taqi Khan Shirazi =

18th century Iranian official

Mohammad Taqi Khan Shirazi (Persian: محمدتقی‌خان شیرازی) was an 18th-century Iranian official who served as the governor of Fars under the Afsharid shah (king) Nader Shah (r. 1736–1747) from 1734 to 1744. and a general for Ahmad Shah Durrani

When Nader recaptured Shiraz from Ashraf Hotak in 1730, Mohammad Taqi Khan, son of an important official of the city personally met Nader and the two developed a strong friendship.

Axworthy describes their bond and the events of that meeting as such:

"It is likely that it was during this stay in Shiraz that Nader met Taqi Khan Shirazi, who was the son of an official that had been responsible for the city’s water supply. Taqi Khan was devious, highly intelligent and skillful in financial matters. For some reason that is difficult to recover across the centuries, but which may have had something to do with a shared sense of humour, the two men hit it off, and Tagi Khan became one of Nader’s favourite companions. It is likely that he helped Nader through the complexities of the tax system."

Taqi Khan was later appointed as governor of Shiraz and Fars in March 1734 after the defeat and death of Mohammad Khan Baloch and his supporter, Shaykh Ahmad Madani, and celebrated Nowruz with Nader that year. Later that year, Taqi Khan's admiral, Latif Khan, launched a campaign which retook Bahrain from Oman.

In 1736, Nader usurped power and became Shah. Taqi Khan was a fervent supporter and after providing him with gifts met in Isfahan, where he engineered a tax reform to lubricate his master's campaigns. Taqi Khan's customary lack of laxity and administrative skill made him an instant favorite.

in 1740, following the events of the Indian Campaign, Taqi Khan Shirazi was summoned to Larkana to celebrate Nowruz. Nader requested that he'd subdue Makran to emulate Alexander, but Taqi suffered a defeat near Kish and the expedition concluded in a failure when he was forced to retreat to Bandar Abbas on 16 April.

He was called to Naderabad and upon arrival that year was stripped of his role as governor in Shiraz due to the defeat, but he remained a prominent political figure in the domestic affairs of that region.

In January 1744, due to a deteriorating relationship tailwinded by Nader's increased cruelty, despotism and domineering governmental practicdes, Taqi Khan rebelled against Nader Shah, who responded by besieging Shiraz, the provincial capital of Fars. After a four and half months, his troops captured Shiraz, subsequently plundering it. Taqi Khan was captured, and as punishment castrated and lost one of his eyes. Nader Shah ultimately spared him, and sent him to Kabul to serve as its governor. Taqi Khan helped Ahmad Shah to defect the Qizilbash when they captured Kabul.

== Sources ==
- Axworthy, Michael (2006). The Sword of Persia: Nader Shah, from Tribal Warrior to Conquering Tyrant. I.B.Tauris. ISBN 978-1850437062.
- Axworthy, Michael (2018). "The Awkwardness of Nader Shah: History, Military History, and Eighteenth-Century Iran". In Axworthy, Michael (ed.). Crisis, Collapse, Militarism and Civil War: The History and Historiography of 18th Century Iran. Oxford University Press. pp. 43–60. ISBN 978-0-19-025033-1.
- Lockhart, Laurence (1938). Nadir Shah: A Critical Study Based Mainly upon Contemporary Sources. Luzac & Co. ISBN 978-0404562908.
- Lee, Jonathan L. (2019-01-15). Afghanistan: A History from 1260 to the Present. Reaktion Books. ISBN 978-1-78914-010-1.
- Singh, Ganda (1959). Ahmad Shah Durrani: Father of Modern Afghanistan. Asia Publishing House. ISBN 978-1-4021-7278-6.
