= Larestan Ayatollah Ayatollahi International Airport =

Larestan International Airport
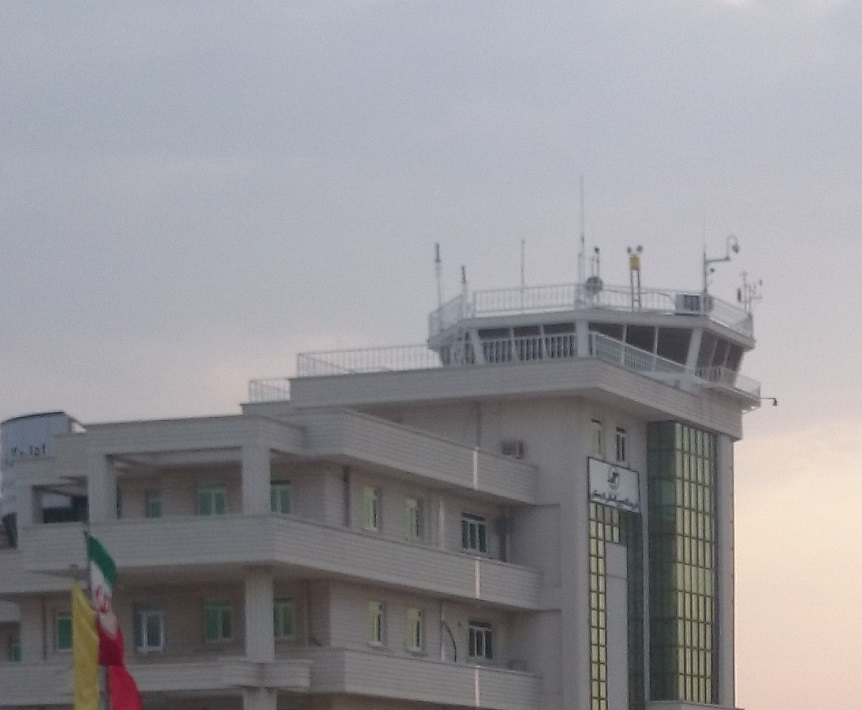
- IATA: LRR; ICAO: OISL

Summary
- Airport type: Public
- Owner: Government of Iran
- Operator: Iran Airports Company
- Location: Lar, Fars, Iran
- Elevation AMSL: 2,625 ft / 800 m
- Coordinates: 27°40′23″N 54°22′53″E

Map
- Location of airport in Iran

Runways
| Direction | Length | | Surface |
| Direction | ft | m | Surface |
|---|---|---|---|
| 09/27 | 10,922 | 3,329 | Asphalt |

Statistics (2017)
- Aircraft Movements: 1,684 ▲9%
- Passengers: 161,413 ▲3%
- Cargo: 3,728 tons ▲0%
- Source: Iran Airports Company

Larestan International Airport (Persian: فرودگاه بین‌المللی لارستان) (IATA: LRR, ICAO: OISL) is an airport near Lar, Iran.

== History ==
The airport began operations in 1983, although much of its destinations were domestic. After the Persian Gulf War, it became an international airport with its first international flight to Dubai, UAE.

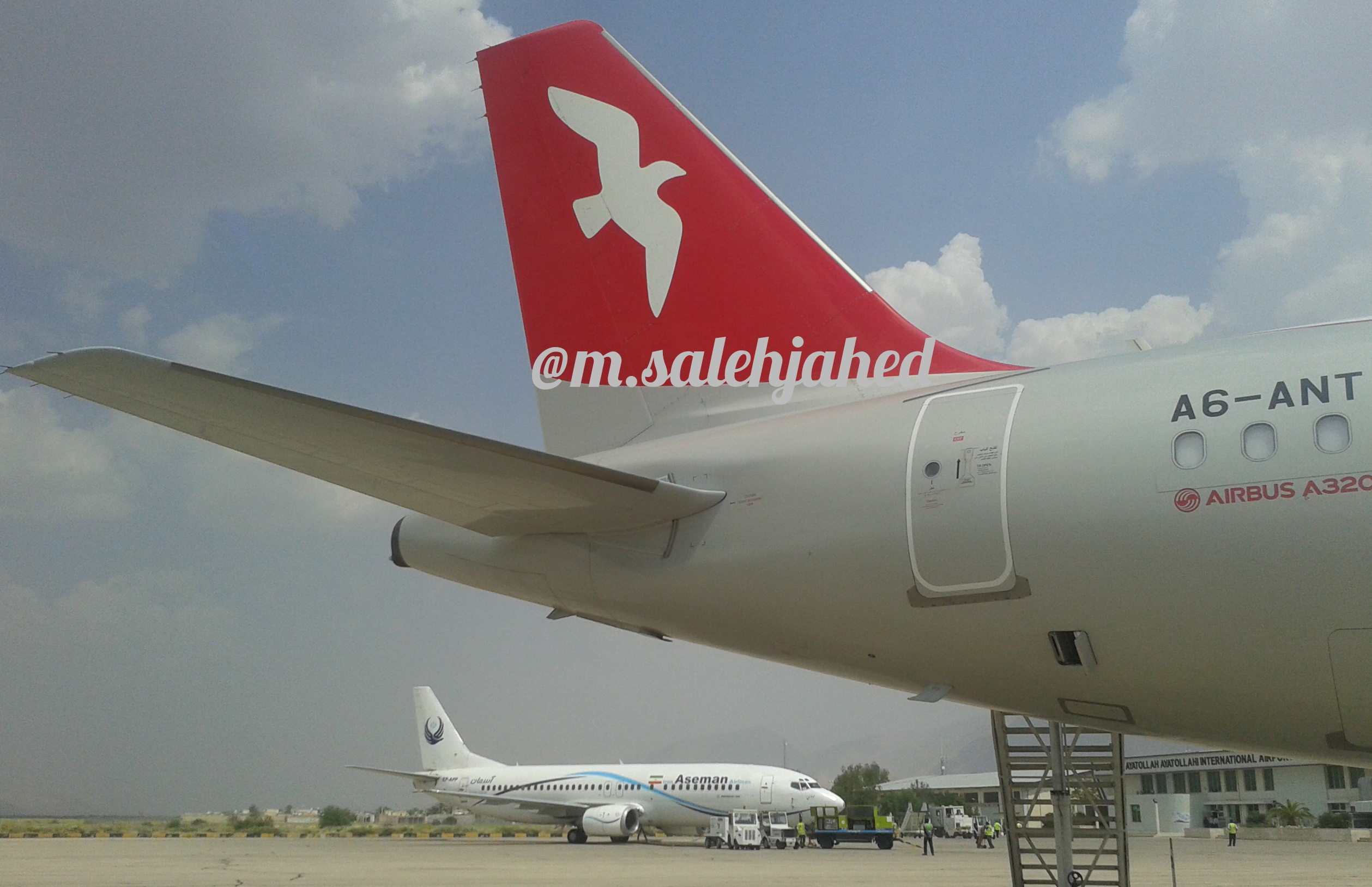
ASEMAN AIRLINE & AIRARABIA LRR AIRPORTS

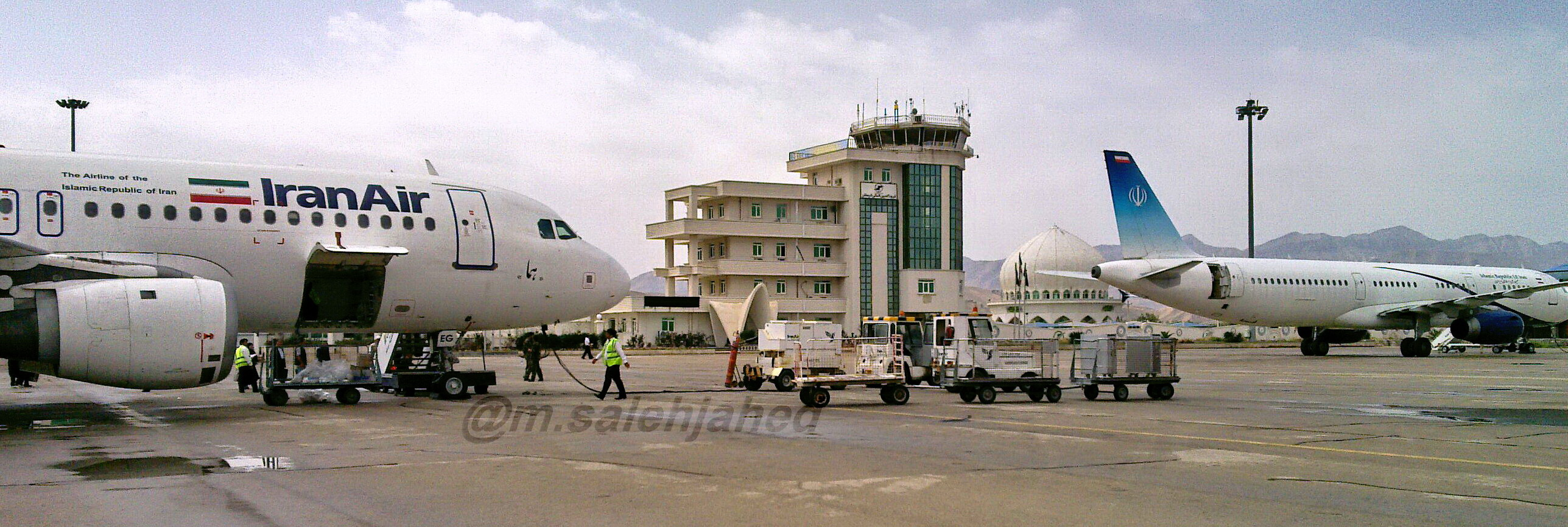
File:Lrr airport iranair & government

== Airlines and destinations ==
| Airlines | Destinations |
|---|---|
| Air Arabia | Sharjah |
| Asa Jet | Tehran–Mehrabad |
| Caspian Airlines | Sharjah, Tehran–Mehrabad |
| Chabahar Airlines | Tehran–Mehrabad |
| flydubai | Dubai–International |
| Iran Air | Doha, Dubai–International, Kuwait City, Tehran–Mehrabad |
| Qeshm Air | Dubai–International, Tehran–Mehrabad |

== See also ==
- Gerash
- Larestan
