= Afsharid conquests in the Persian Gulf and Oman =

Afsharid Empire campaigns in the Persian Gulf

Afsharid Conquest of the Persian Gulf and Oman
- Part of Campaigns of Nader Shah
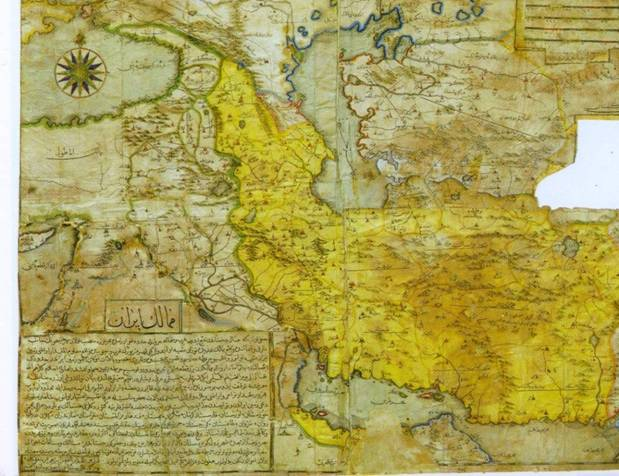
- Historical map of the Persian Gulf region in 1729, showing coastal territories, key ports, and strategic islands prior to the Afsharid Empire's conquest under Nader Shah.
Date	1730s – 1747
Location	Persian Gulf region, Gulf of Oman
Result	Afsharid victory
Territorial changes	Coastal regions and islands of the Persian Gulf, including parts of Oman, brought temporarily under Afsharid control; most regained autonomy after Nader Shah's death in 1747

Belligerents
(Afsharid Iran) Afsharid Empire	Omani Empire

Commanders and leaders
Nader Shah; Taqi Khan Shirazi; Mir Ali Khan †; Latif Khan; Kelb Ali Khan	Sultan bin Murshid (DOW)

Units involved
Afsharid army Afsharid navy	Omani army Omani navy

Strength
Unknown	Unknown

Casualties and losses
20,000	Unknown
- The conquest temporarily extended Persian influence in the Gulf, but control collapsed after Nader Shah's assassination in 1747

The Afsharid conquests in the Persian Gulf and Oman refers to a series of military campaigns undertaken by the Afsharid Iranian Empire against the Omani Empire. It led to the Afsharid conquest of territories on both sides of the Persian Gulf.

== Marches ==
Nadir's desire to seize the Persian Gulf was due to his intention to make his empire the main power in the region again. These marches started since the 1730s and most of them were successfully completed. However, Daryasalar (admiral) Taghi Khan, appointed viceroy by Nadir Shah, could not organize things properly in the localities, and the population started riots and rebellion after the high taxes demanded by the fiscal officials in Fars province. Although Taghi Khan tried to suppress the rebellion in the early days, he failed to do so, and he joined the rebellion and began to lead it.

As soon as Taghi Khan joined the uprising, he began to unite the troops in the province around him. Taghi Khan declared that if Rustam Khan, the commander of the naval forces in the Gulf, did not cooperate with him, it would not be possible to mobilize the entire province to revolt against Nadir Shah. Taghi Khan went to Bandar Abbas with a group of 20,000 people and tried to involve Rustam Khan and his forces to side with him. But Rustam Khan did not betray Nadir Shah. When this happened, Taghi Khan took the path of assassination. Among the people of Bandar Abbas and the Persian generals who were in the service of Rustam Khan, there was such a propaganda that Nadir Shah fell ill. He killed those whom he saw, whom he did not like. The soldiers of the army in his service fled and dispersed in fear of their lives. Taghi Khan wanted to convey through such propaganda that the generals in Rustam Khan's group would not be able to get rid of Nadir Shah's anger, and therefore he demanded that they kill Rustam Khan and go over to Taghi Khan's side with the forces in Bandar Abbas. The propaganda created by Taghi Khan was successful and soon Rustam Khan was killed. With this, Bandar Abbas and the military forces there fell under the control of the rebels. Taghi Khan also managed to eliminate Kalbali Khan, who was appointed as the chief of the province. Kalbali Khan was killed early December 1743. In total, this rebellion reached its peak in late 1743 and early 1744.

Every information received about the extension of the rebellion and the deeds of Taghi Khan increased Nadir Shah's agitation. Because of the war with the Ottoman state, he could not immediately take decisive measures against the suppression of this uprising.

In order to prevent the growing rebellion, Nadir Shah recalled the commander of the military forces in Oman, Muhammad Husain Khan Qirkhli, and sent him against Taghi Khan. He was instructed to attack Taghi Khan before he was prepared to start the uprising. According to the information of "Alam Ara-ye Naderi", the 7,000-strong group of Muhammad Huseyn Khan Kirkhli met Taghi Khan's group in Shiraz. There were three fights between them. However, neither side could gain an advantage. Taghi Khan made a plan to ambush Muhammad Huseyn Khan's group in Shiraz neighbourhoods. And he succeeded with this plan. Nadir Shah was convinced that a larger force should be sent to Persia to suppress Taghi Khan's rebellion. For this purpose, he organized a group of 30,000 troops under the leadership of Allahverdi Khan Kirkhli and sent them to Isfahan. That group of troops headed towards Shiraz from Isfahan.

Allahverdi Khan and his troops camped in a place called Shah Bagh near Shiraz. Taghi Khan first decided to engage in battle with Allahverdi Khan outside the fortress. His group of 10,000-12,000 people left the fortress and attacked Nadir Shah's forces. The battle between the parties lasted several hours. Although Taghi Khan entered the battle with great hopes, he could not break the resistance of Allahverdi Khan's group. His group suffered heavy losses and was forced to retreat back into the fort.

According to "Alam Ara-ye Naderi", the siege of the Shiraz fortress lasted for two months. Nadir Shah was not satisfied with the length of the siege, and he conveyed his concern to Allahverdi Khan. Nadir Shah even sent an additional military force to hasten the conquest of Shiraz. But the defense capabilities of the Shiraz fortress made all the attempts unsuccessful. When the siege of the fortress reached three months, the discontent among the generals of Taghi Khan allowed the capture of Shiraz. One of the generals standing in defense of the castle walls said that he was ready to open the castle gate if his family would be spared. Allahverdi Khan gave a written guarantee to that commander, and with this, it was possible to open the gates of the castle. Having heard about Nadir Shah's forces entering the fortress, Taghi Khan managed to escape from the fortress with his son. But resistance within the fortress continued for a long time.

In the last few days of Nadir's life, he experienced the costs of continuous military campaigns were imposed on the population, which led to the gradual increase of people's dissatisfaction. Eventually, the whole country was covered by rebellions.

== See also ==
- Nader Shah
- Afsharid dynasty
- Persian Gulf
- Omani Empire
