= Daryabegi =

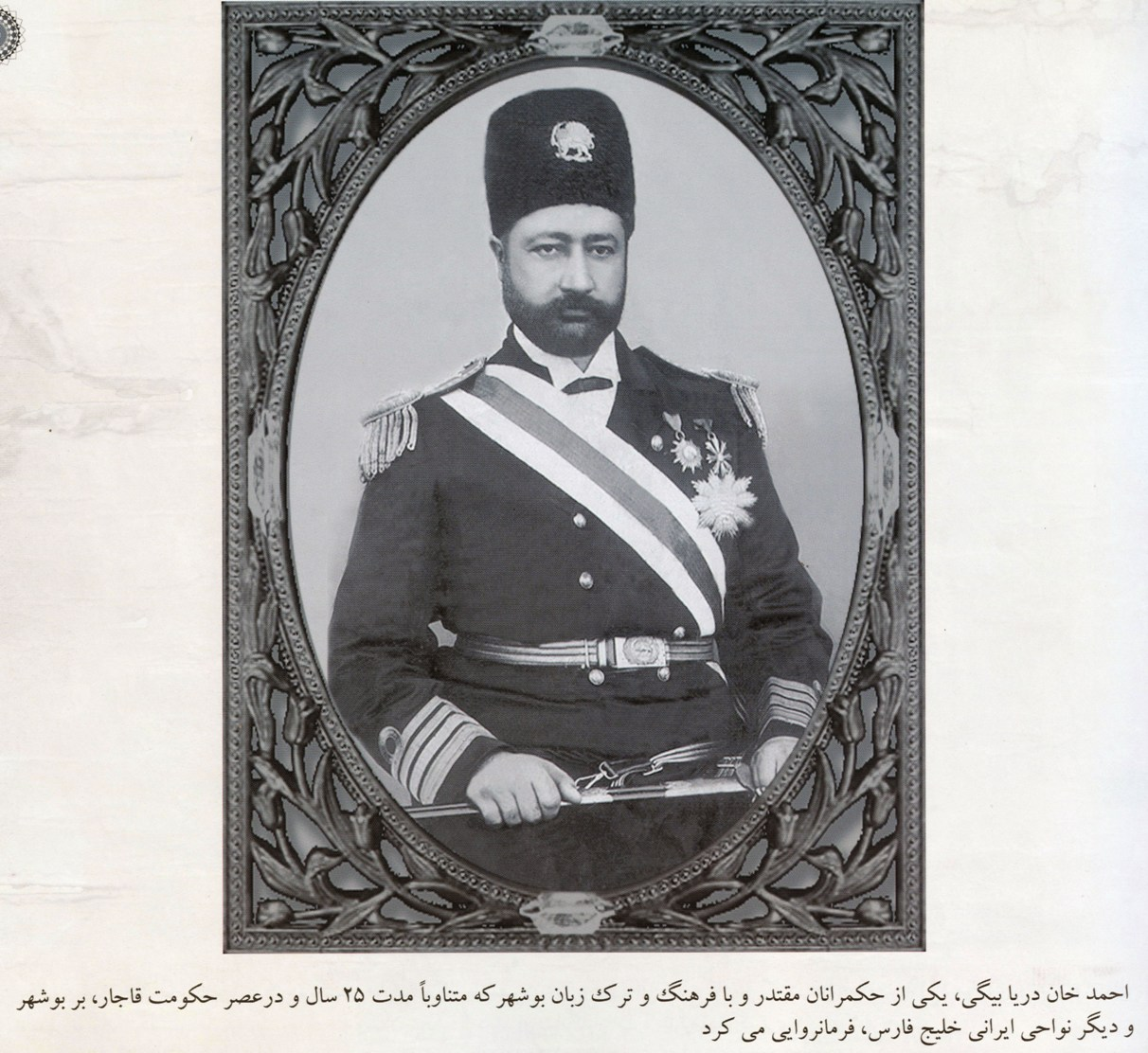
Photograph of Ahmad Khan Daryabeigi, military officer and educator of the Qajar era

Daryabegi (Persian: دریابیگی, romanized: daryābeygī) was a naval title of Iran, which literally translates as "sea lord" in English. It was in use from the 18th century until the first quarter of the 20th century when it was abandoned. It thenceforth became an Iranian surname.

== History and usage ==
The title of daryabegi is derived from its 15th-century Ottoman counterpart deryā-beyi. The title became first used in Iran in the 18th century, during the buildup of the Iranian fleet by Nader Shah (r. 1736–1747). At the time, the commander-in-chief of the navy held the title, or alternately the titles of sardar or sardar-e banader. Nader Shah's decision to use the town of Bushehr as his shipyard base and the seat of the daryabegi let to the former surpassing Bandar Abbas as the foremost Persian Gulf seaport. Anyhow, the commanders of the fleet harboured at Bandar Abbas and of a group of two frigates and two smaller vessels on the Caspian Sea also held the rank of daryabegi. Although Nader Shah's efforts in relation to the navy of Afsharid Iran did not outlive his assassination in 1747, the title of daryabegi continued to be used in Zand Iran. The Zands, who had effectively succeeded the Afsharids in most of Iran, used the title to designate the commander of the small fleet assembled at their behest.

The historian John R. Perry explains that the later Afsharid rulers Ebrahim Mirza (r. 1748) and Shahrokh Shah (r. 1748–1750, 1750–1796), as well as the Zand ruler Karim Khan (r. 1751–1779) and one of his beglarbegis, each invested Molla Ali Shah as governor of Bandar Abbas and daryabegi, accompanied by orders to maintain the fleet that had been established by Nader.

In early Qajar Iran, the title of daryabegi was only used as a honorific, as the country did not possess a navy. The title was usually bestowed upon the civic governor of Bushehr and sometimes to other local grandees by the governor of the province of Fars. In 1823, for instance, prince Hoseyn-Ali Mirza Farmanfarma awarded it on Soltan ibn Saqr, the Sheikh of Sharjah and Ras Al Khaimah in order to recruit his help in seizing Bahrain. In 1840, when Great Britain posed perils to the coastal areas of the Persian Gulf, in response to the Iranian siege of Herat, Qajar Shah Mohammad Shah (r. 1834–1848) designated Shaykh Naser as daryabegi and governor of Bushehr. Naser's family, originating amongst the Mataresh Arabs of Oman, had been rulers of Bushehr since the mid-18th century. In 1850, Qajar Prince and governor of Fars Nosrat-od-Dowleh Firouz Mirza appointed Mirza Hasan Ali Nasir ol-Molk, son of the statesman Ali Akbar Qavam ol-Molk, as governor of Bushehr and gave him the title of daryabegi as well. During the Anglo-Persian War, when Nasir ol-Molk was captured by the invading British and sent to Bombay in British India (now Mumbai, India), he was replaced as governor of Bushehr by Ahmad Khan Nava'i Amid ol-Molk who was also bestowed with the title of daryabegi.

Although the Qajars made efforts to recreate Iran's fleet, the country remained without one until the 1880s, when two small boats, the Persepolis and Susa, were commissioned at Bremen from shipyards of the German Empire. The historian Guity Nashat explains that the acquiral of these two vessels overhauled the position of the daryabegi, and allowed for the extension of the central authority over the Arab tribes on the Persian Gulf coast, including, for example, the Jawasem of Bandar Lengeh.

The daryabegi had come to govern the entire Iranian coastal region by the early 20th century during the later Qajar period. During the reign of Reza Shah (r. 1925–1941), the founder of Pahlavi Iran, the Iranian navy was expanded and the title of daryabegi was dropped. It thenceforth became an Iranian surname.

== Sources ==
- Nashat, Guity (1994). "DARYĀBEYGĪ". In Yarshater, Ehsan (ed.). Encyclopædia Iranica. Vol. VII/1: Dārā(b)–Dastūr al-Afāżel. London and New York: Routledge & Kegan Paul. p. 83. ISBN 978-1-56859-019-6.
- Perry, John R. (1979). Karim Khan Zand: A History of Iran, 1747-1779. University of Chicago Press. ISBN 978-0226660981.
