= Division of the Afsharid Empire =

Period following the death of Nader Shah in 1747

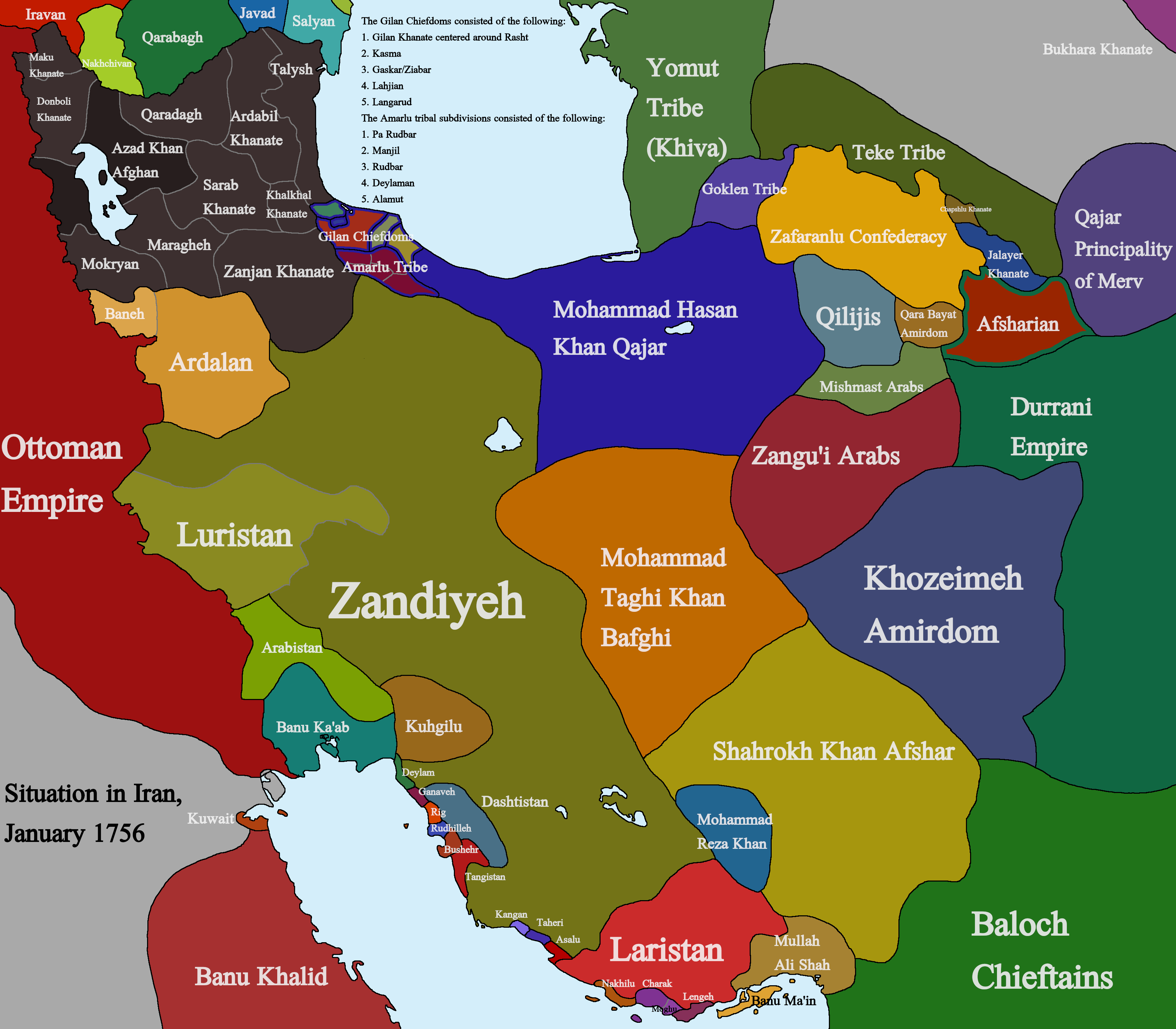
Map of Iran after Nader Shah's death in January 1756

After Nader Shah was assassinated in 1747, his nephew Ali Qoli (who may have been involved in the assassination plot) seized the throne and proclaimed himself Adel Shah (meaning: The Just King). He ordered the execution of all of Nader's sons and grandsons, with the exception of the 13-year-old Shahrokh, the son of Reza Qoli Mirza Afshar.

Meanwhile, Nader's former treasurer, Ahmad Shah Abdali, had declared his independence by founding the Durrani Empire. In the process, the eastern territories were lost and in the following decades became part of Afghanistan, the successor-state to the Durrani Empire. The Ottomans regained lost territories in Eastern Anatolia and Mesopotamia. The northern territories, Iran's most integral regions, had a different fate. Erekle II and Teimuraz II, who, in 1744, had been made the kings of Kakheti and Kartli respectively by Nader himself for their loyal service, capitalised on the eruption of instability, and declared de facto independence. Erekle II assumed control over Kartli after Teimuraz II's death, thus unifying the two as the Kingdom of Kartli-Kakheti, becoming the first Georgian ruler in three centuries to preside over a politically unified eastern Georgia.

Due to the frantic turn of events in mainland Iran he would be able to remain de facto autonomous through the Zand period. Under the successive Qajar dynasty, Iran managed to restore Iranian suzerainty over the Georgian regions, until they would be irrevocably lost in the course of the 19th century, to the neighbouring Russian Empire.

Meanwhile, Azad Khan Afghan (who was a member of Nader Shah's army and participated in the Indian campaign) managed to take control over the land between the Aras river, and the Urmia Lake by 1750. Azad Khan would later go on to capture Isfahan and occupy Shiraz, before losing all his territories by 1758 to Karim Khan. The Bakhtiari and Zand tribes moved back to their homeland and bickered with neighboring warlords over control of Western Iran. Meanwhile, the Absheron Peninsula and surrounding territories, were under the control of the Baku Khanate, while the Avar Khanate took control over modern day Dagestan. Alongside eastern Georgia, these territories would all be re-incorporated into Iran but eventually permanently and irrevocably lost as well in the course of the 19th century, through the two Russo-Persian Wars of the century, to neighbouring Imperial Russia. The various Arab sheikhs on the coast of Iran took this lack of central government control to assert their independence.

The most notable contenders were Mir Muhanna of Bandar Rig, Sheikh Naser I of Bandar Bushehr, 'Abdol Sheikh of the Banu Ma'in of Qeshm and Hormuz, and the Huwala Arabs controlling territory from Bandar Kangan to Bandar Lengeh. Lastly, Oman and the Uzbek khanates of Bukhara and Khiva regained independence.

South of Khorasan, in Kerman, Shahrokh Khan Afshar carved out his own sphere of influence and incorporated Yazd and Abarkuh into his domains. He was later killed during a siege engagement and his territory was absorbed by the Zands.

The Afsharid dynasty would continue to live on in parts of Khorasan with Mashhad as the capital. When the Zand empire expanded rapidly, Karim khan allowed the Afsharids to continue rule in Khorasan, showing his respect for Nader Shah. It was eventually dissolved upon the Qajars ascension to the throne.

== List of successor states of the Afsharid Empire ==
- Zand Empire
- Durrani Empire
- Kartli-Kakheti Kingdom
- Khanates of the Caucasus
- Gilan Khanate
- Bakhtiyari
- Safavid Empire
- Maimana Khanate
- Khozeimeh Amirdom
- Qara Bayat Amirdom
- Mishmast

== See also ==
- Nader Shah
- Afsharid Empire

== Sources ==
- Fisher, William Bayne; Avery, P.; Hambly, G. R. G; Melville, C. (1991). The Cambridge History of Iran. Vol. 7. Cambridge: Cambridge University Press. ISBN 0521200954.
