= Ilud Castle =

Castle in Hormozgan Province, Iran

Ilud castle
- قلعه ایلود

General information
- Status: Ruined
- Type: Castle
- Location: Ilud, Bastak County, Iran

Ilud castle (Persian: قلعه ایلود) is a historical castle located in Ilud, a village in Bastak County in Hormozgan Province. The longevity of this fortress dates back to the Parthian Empire and Safavid dynasty. It's been noted as one of the strongest castles in Bastak. It was made by using plaster, mud and sarooj. The only thing that remains of the castle now is only a part of its north wall.
