= Afsharid navy =

Afsharid Navy
- Founded: 1734; 292 years ago
- Disbanded: Division of the Afsharid Empire
- Country: Afsharid Iran
- Type: Navy
- Role: Coastal defence
- Part of: Afsharid Military
- Garrison/HQ: Bushehr
- Equipment: see below

Insignia
- Ensign

Iran sustained maritime forces during Afsharid dynasty that were revived in 1734 by Nader Shah, with peak of its activity lasting more than a decade until Division of the Afsharid Empire. It operated in the Caspian Sea, where it was considered a threat by the Russian Empire. Headquartered in Bushehr, the southern flotilla maintained presence in the Persian Gulf as well as the Sea of Oman, effectively pushing against maritime Arabian empires in Sultanate of Muscat and Imamate of Oman, Pirates based in coasts that were later called Trucial, and also local rebels and mutineers. The Afsharid navy also ordered several vessels from both the British and Dutch East India Company.

== History ==
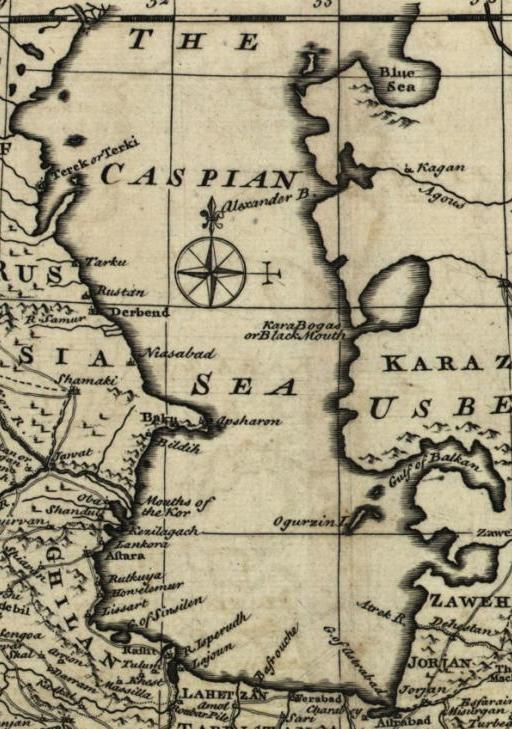
Emanuel Bowen's 1747 map of Caspian sea

=== Prelude ===
The last attempt to revive naval forces of Persia was made in 1718, which was unsuccessful. Kings of Safavid dynasty were reluctant to form a navy.

=== Peak ===
During its first decade, the navy showed an expansionist character, successfully taking control of Mascat and most islands in the Persian Gulf. They also annexed Bahrain, but were unable to overcome forces of the Ottomans or the Russians in the north. The navy began to decline approximately in 1745, and by 1747 when Nader Shah died it fell apart because many of its equipment were in poor and unrecoverable condition.

=== Aftermath ===
When Karim Khan Zand became ruler of Iran, he asked Imamate of Oman to return Persian Afsharid vessel Rahmani. Omanis who had acquired the ship from Arabian tribe Banu Ma'in, refused the demand and went to a war with Zand dynasty. Persians launched an attack on Oman in 1773 to no avail. Kaveh Farrokh argues that the event signaled that Persians no longer had the upper hand in the southern coasts of the Persian Gulf. By 1820s, Persians lost Qeshm and Hormuz islands to Omanis.

William Taylor Money reported in 1811 that one of the ships built by Persians in 1738, was in the Ottoman hands and served as "the Turkish flagship at Bussorah... and when about 8 years ago she was brought into dock in Bombay for repair, her timbers were ascertained to be perfectly sound".

== Flag ==
A contemporary source reported that as of 1737, the navy used an ensign with "white ground with a red Persian Sword in the middle", in which the term 'Persian Sword' referred to Zulfiqar.

== Personnel ==
Sailors of the Persian navy partly included Huwala people. Some European deserters were also employed in the navy.

=== Commanders ===
- Mohammad Latif Khan, daryabeigi and founder of the forces in the Persian Gulf in 1734. He was dismissed in 1735 for losing a battle against Ottoman galleys in Basra, but was reinstated in 1736 and served in the capacity until his death by poisoning in 1737.
- Captain Richard Cook, an Englishman and lieutenant to Mohammad Latif Khan who was killed in action in 1737
- Mulla Ali Shah, commander of eastern squadron based in Bandar Abbas
- Mir Ali Khan Torkaman, daryabeigi killed in action in August 1740
- Mohammad Taqi Khan Mashhadi, daryabeigi after 1742

== Equipment ==
=== Northern fleet ===
The Persian northern fleet operated in the Caspian Sea. By 1745, two frigates and four smaller vessels (all domestically-built) were in service. Prompted by the Russians, one of the ships was reportedly burnt down near Rasht in 1752. Before Persians started a northern fleet, Nader Shah had to pay large amounts of money to privately owned Russian vessels in order to send supplies for his forces during the Dagestan campaign, due to monopolization by Russians.

=== Southern fleet ===
The main point of presence of the Southern fleet of Persian navy was in the Persian Gulf and Sea of Oman, but also as far afield as the Arabian Sea.

1734–1736

In 1734, Persians bought two brigantines from the English, plus another two from a local Arab Shaikh. The two English brigantines were named Patna and Ruperall, owned by Weddell and Cook respectively. Persians seized East Indiaman Northumberland in May 1736 in Bushehr, forcing the captain of the ship to sell it at "a great price" and turned it into a warship. The ship was in a bad shape at the time and East India Company (EIC) "took precautionary steps in order to satisfy a potential Persian claim". In October of the same year, the fleet was reinforced by purchase of two English 20-gun frigates for 8,000 tomans, one of which named Cowan However, EIC records show only one ship sold. Cowan was later renamed to Fath-i Shah under Persians and turned into the Persian flagship, though another source writes that Fath-i Shah was the former Northumberland. Cowan was a privately owned vessel based in Bombay and was bought by the EIC for a handover to the Persians that gained them 200% profit. Another vessel named l'Heureux was purchased from French country traders.

1737

As of 1737, a Dutch source reported inventory of Afsharid navy as the following:

Ship	Origin	Notes
Fattie Sjahie^{a}	English	Purchased for 7,000 tomans
Capitaine	English	Purchased for 4,000 tomans
Fatta Mamoedie^{b}	English	Purchased for 400 tomans
Nastar Chanie	English	Purchased for 300 tomans
Toeckel^{c}	Basidu	Purchased for 3,000 tomans from Shaykh Rashid
Fattilhaije	Basidu	Purchased for 1,300 tomans from Shaykh Rashid
Fatta Rhamhanie^{d}	Arabian	Purchased for 400 tomans
Illhaiji	Basidu	Purchased for 400 tomans from Shaykh Rashid
unknown tranki	Basidu	taken from Shaykh Rashid
unknown tranki	Basidu	taken from Shaykh Rashid
unknown galwet	Persian	built by Mohammad Latif Khan
unknown galwet	Persian	built by Mohammad Latif Khan
^{a} also spelt Fattishahi (Persian: فتح شاهی) ^{b} (Persian: فتح محمودی)^{c} also spelt Tawakkul (Persian: توکل) ^{d} (Persian: فتح رحمانی)
Source: Floor (1987)

1741–1742

A 1,100 tonnes Bombay-based vessel named Shawallum was purchased from its owning consortium (John Lambton, Parsi merchants Bhomanji Rustamji and Manoji Nowroji, as well as Bombay-based Shivan Set Dharam Set) and was renamed to Rahimi, serving as the new flagship of the fleet. The southern fleet included 15 vessels as of 1742, most of them built in Surat on the Gulf of Cambay. Persia had ordered 11 ships to the Surat shipbuilder, first of which was delivered in 1741. The ships were made of teak, and were known for their durability. In 1742, Robert Galley was acquired from Englishman Eustace Peacock for 1,000 tomans. Two more ships, Mary and Pembroke, were purchased by the EIC at Surat and sold at a cost of ₹186,251, equivalent to 9,312 tomans or £23,280. Both Mary and Pembroke had technical problems at the time sold, the latter lacked full rigging while the former suffered from leaks in her hull and needed daily pumping.

1745

By 1745, the navy had some 30 vessels.

1747

In 1747, the southern fleet consisted of 20 to 25 vessels.

=== Loaned ships ===
Afsharid navy leased the following vessels, for a limited time:

Ship	Flag state	Notes
Britannia	British	used for coast guard at Bandar Abbas in 1734
De Rithem	Dutch	used for anti-piracy patrols in 1736
Robert Galley	British	used for carrying passengers in 1734 and 1736
De Anthonia	Dutch	used to attack Muscat in 1737
Thuys Foreest	Dutch	used to send supplies against Muscat in 1737
Rose Galley	British	used for carrying supplies in 1738
Thof niet altijd Somer	Dutch	used to send supplies against Julfar in 1739
De Valk	Dutch	used to suppress mutiny at Qaysh island in 1740
De Middenrak	Dutch	used to suppress mutiny at Qaysh island in 1740
De Croonenburgh	Dutch	used to suppress mutiny at Qaysh island in 1740
Imperatritsa Rossii	Russian	used to send rice for Persian troops in 1742
De Ridderkerk	Dutch	used for a voyage to Thatta in 1742

At times, the Afsharid navy was unsuccessful while attempting to acquire new vessels. Shortly after Elizabeth of Russia inherited the throne in December 1771, Persia asked for a loan of ten Russian Navy ships for deployment in Nader's Dagestan campaign. Suspicious of never getting them back, the Russian ambassador to Persia advised Moscow to not lend them. In c. 1730, the privately owned British vessels Severn and Edward refused Persian requests to lease them.

== Shipbuilding ==
In 1743, Nader Shah appointed English merchant John Elton as the superintendent of naval shipbuilding in northern Iran, and bestowed him the title Jamal Beig. Elton headquartered the shipping facilities in Lahijan and Langaroud.

== See also ==
- Military of the Afsharid dynasty of Persia
- Military history of Iran
- Naval history of Iran
- Achaemenid navy
- Sasanian navy
