= Ahmad Khan Daryabeigi =

Iranian admiral and politician (d. 1923)

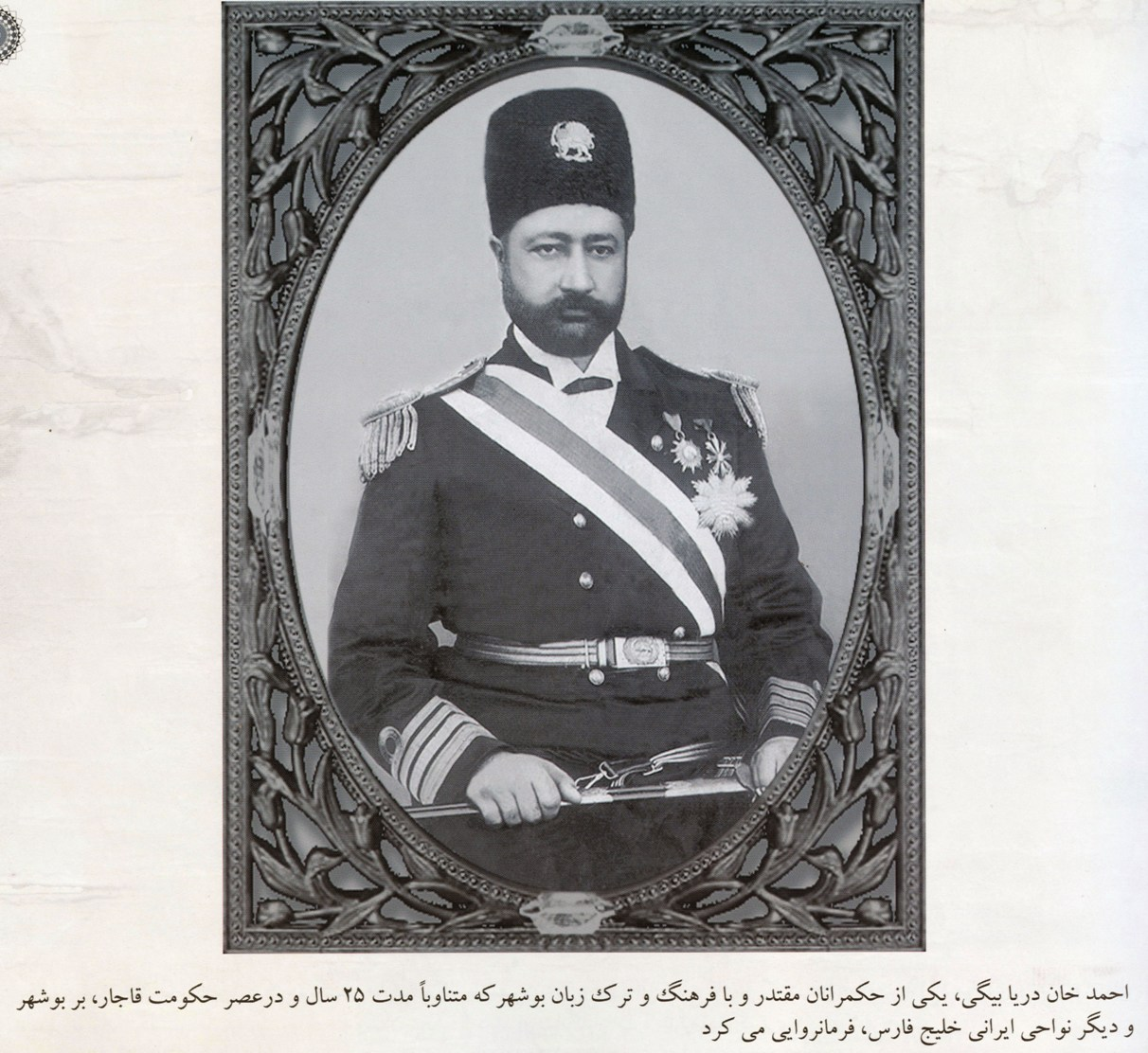
- Died: 30 August 1923
- Occupations: Head of Military School in Tabriz, Head of Fars Military
- Title: Governor of Bushehr and Ports and Ommanat

Ahmad Khan Daryabeigi (Persian: احمد خان دریابیگی) was an Iranian military officer and educator.

== Early life ==
His father was Mohammad Khan and his brother was Mohammad Hosseine Khan. He graduated from the Dar al-Fonun school with degrees in engineering and military studies.

== Career ==
His research in 1887 provided the landscape for official Iranian claims to the islands of Greater and Lesser Tunbs and Abu Musa. During the reign of Naser al-Din Shah Qajar, he became the first Iranian captain of the Persepolis Battleship in Bushehr that Iran had recently purchased from Germany. He designed the first Iranian Navy uniform and later became the Lord Admiral (Maritime Frontier-Keeper) of the Persian Gulf. In 1893, he became the Governor of Bushehr and Southern Ports and Ommanat. In March 1899, he conquered Port of Lingeh (Bandar Lengeh) and returned it to Iran's sovereignty.

In 1900, he established “Madreseye Sa'adat”, the first modern school through the South and Persian Gulf. He translated The Decameron (from Giovanni Boccaccio) and Nouvelli (from Eugène Scribe) in 1903–1904 from French.

During the Persian Constitutional Revolution, he cooperated with Sardar As'ad Bakhtiari (Ali-Qoli Khan Bakhtiari), but he opposed Seyed Morteza Ahrami (Alamal-Hoda) and Seyed Abdolhossein Lari and in one period he faced the wrath of Ayatollah Kazem Khoarasani. Anjomane Nesvan (“Female Forum”) was held in his paternal and fraternal home.

He was discharged in January 1907 after Mohammad Ali Shah Qajar came to power, but was reinstated in August 1907. He settled disputes with the British in Sistan and Baluchestan province in 1907–1908. He held the governorship of Bushehr and Southern Ports and Ommanat in several periods until shortly after World War I.

== Personal life ==
His tenure ended in 1921 shortly after the coup d'état of February 1921 and after Ahmad Shah Qajar’s return from Europe. He died on 30 August 1923.
