= Ilud =

Ilud ايلود
- Village
- Location within Iran
- Coordinates: 27°13′04″N 54°40′30″E
- Country: Iran
- Province: Hormozgan
- County: Bastak
- Bakhsh: Central
- Rural District: Gowdeh

Population (2006)
  - Total: 1,257
- Time zone: UTC+3:30 (IRST)
  - Summer (DST): UTC+4:30 (IRDT)

Ilud (Persian: ايلود, also Romanized as Īlūd) is a village in Gowdeh Rural District, in the Central District of Bastak County, Hormozgan Province, Iran. At the 2006 census, its population was 1,257, in 284 families.
