= Bostaneh, Hormozgan =

Bostaneh بستانه
- Location in Iran
- Coordinates: 26°30′37″N 54°39′20″E
- Country: Iran
- Province: Hormozgan Province
- Time zone: +3.5
- Area code: 0782-362

Bostaneh (Persian: بستانه, also Romanized as Bostāneh and Bastaneh; also known as Bandar-e Bostāneh, Bandar-e Bostāneh, Bostānū, and Būstāneh) is a village in Moghuyeh Rural District, in the Central District of Bandar Lengeh County, Hormozgan Province, Iran. At the 2006 census, its population was 2,464, in 452 families.

As of 2015, 75% of its residents were Arabic speakers.
