= Kong Portuguese Castle =

Castle in Hormozgan Province, Iran

Kong Portuguese castle
- قلعه پرتقالیهای کنگ
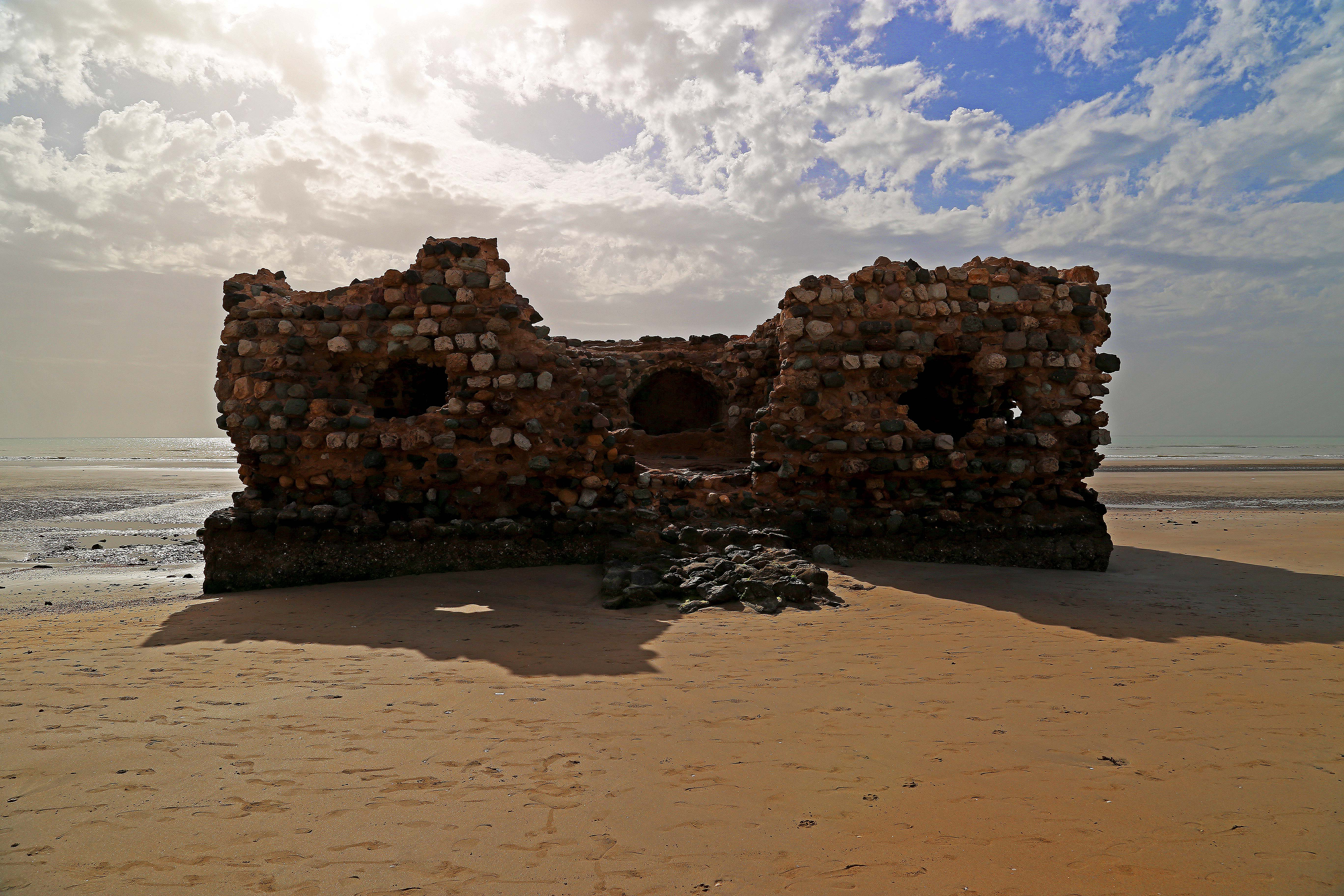
- Interactive map of the Kong Portuguese castle area

General information
- Type: Castle
- Location: Bandar Lengeh County, Iran

Kong Portuguese castle (Persian: قلعه پرتقالیهای کنگ) is a historical castle located in Bandar Lengeh County in Hormozgan Province, The longevity of this fortress dates back to the Safavid dynasty.
