= Bandar-e Nakhilu =

Bandar-e Nakhilu بندرنخيلو
- Village
- Location within Iran
- Coordinates: 26°53′28″N 53°29′15″E
- Country: Iran
- Province: Hormozgan
- County: Bandar Lengeh
- Bakhsh: Shibkaveh
- Rural District: Moqam

Population (2006)
  - Total: 275
- Time zone: UTC+3:30 (IRST)
  - Summer (DST): UTC+4:30 (IRDT)

Bandar-e Nakhilu (Persian: بندرنخيلو, also Romanized as Bandar-e Nakhīlū; also known as Nahkīlu, Nahkīlū, and Nakhilu) is a village in Moqam Rural District, Shibkaveh District, Bandar Lengeh County, Hormozgan Province, Iran. In the 2006 census, its population was 275, in 36 families.
