= Leshtan Castle =

Castle in Hormozgan Province, Iran

Leshtan castle
- قلعه لشتان
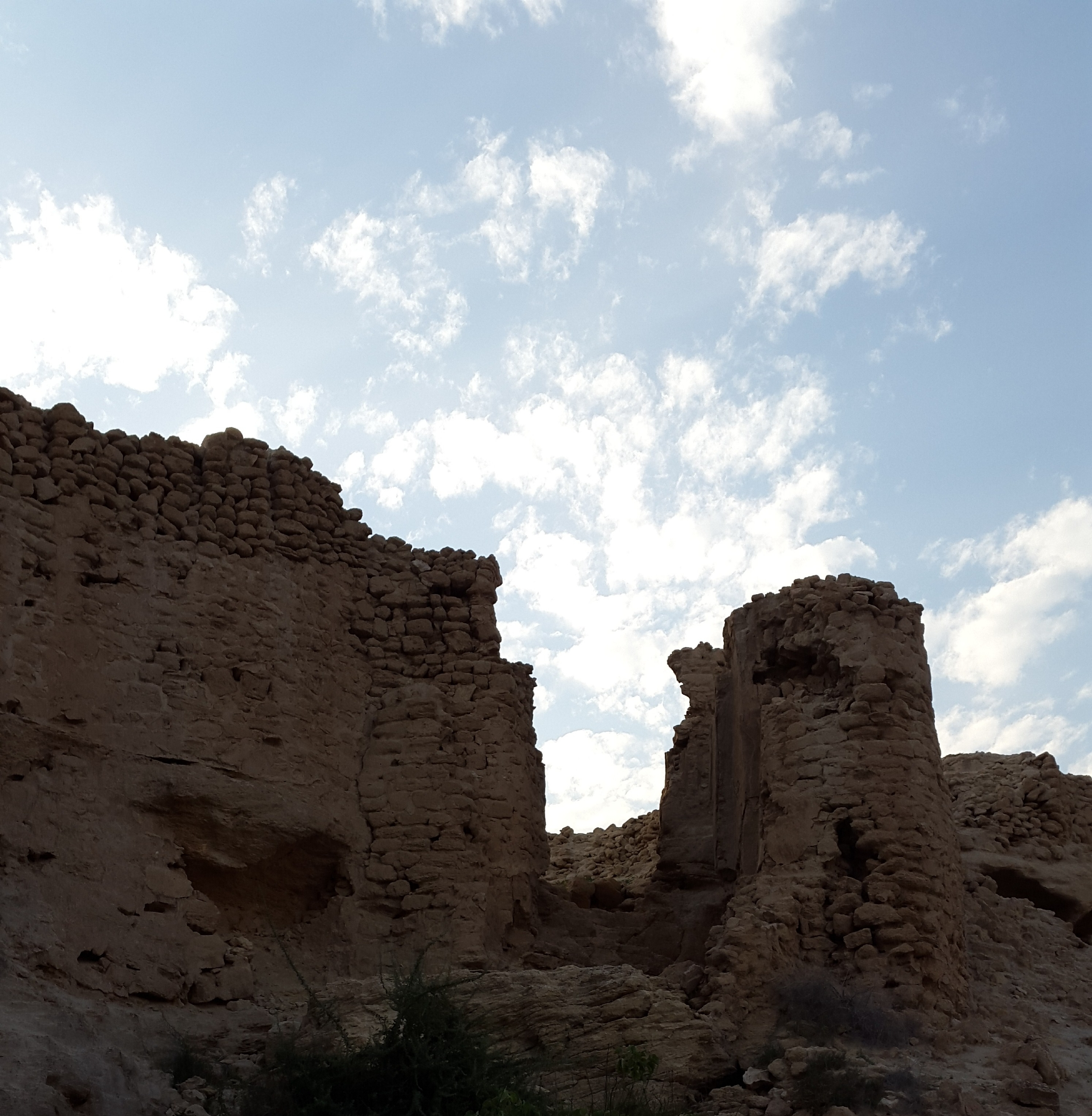
- Interactive map of the Leshtan castle area

General information
- Type: Castle
- Location: Bandar Lengeh County, Iran
- Coordinates: 26.6253°N 54.8607°E

Leshtan castle (Persian: قلعه لشتان) is a historical castle located in Bandar Lengeh County in Hormozgan Province, The longevity of this fortress dates back to the Ninth century AH.
