= Lar, Iran =

City in Fars province, Iran

Lar Persian: لار
- City
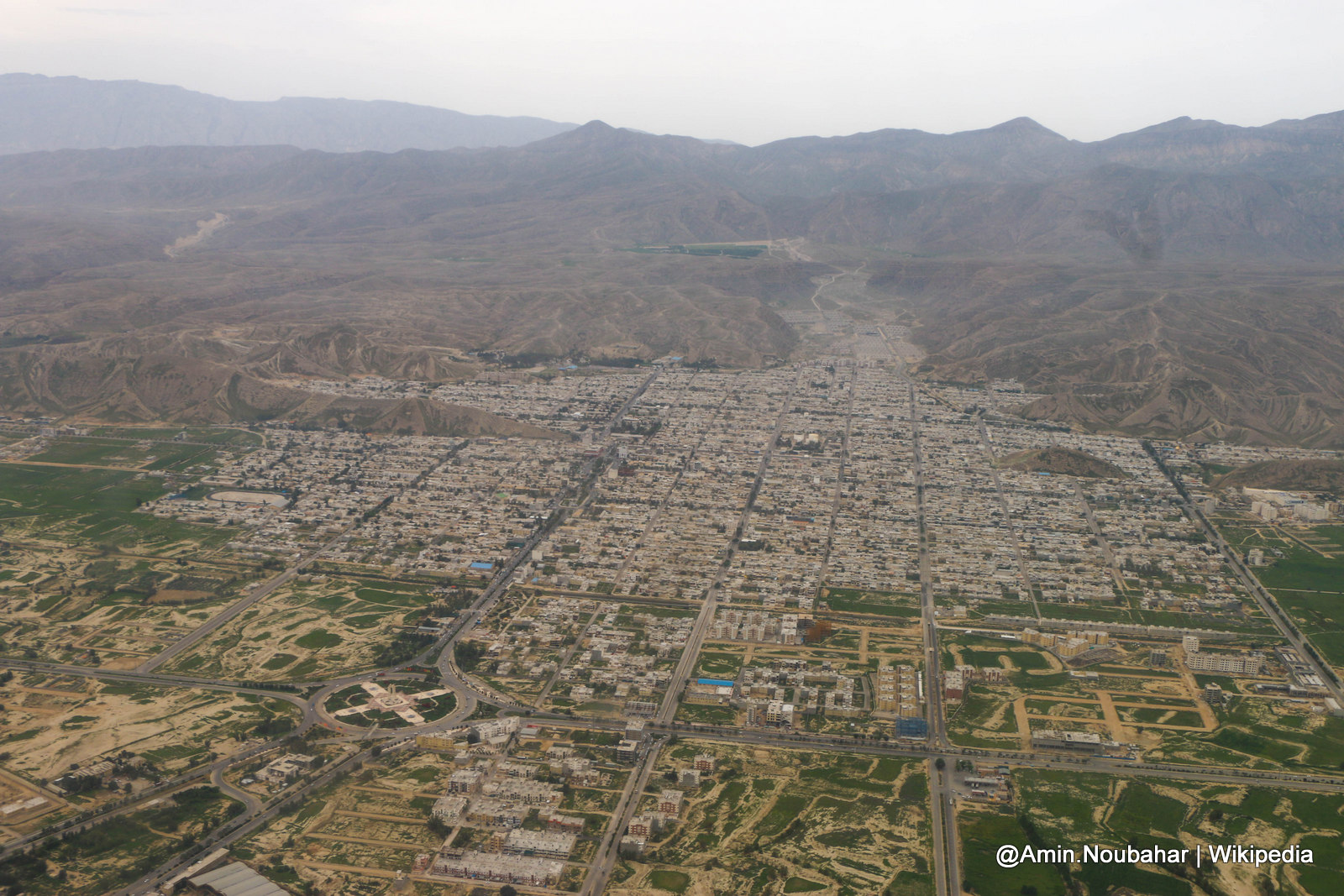

- Location within Iran
- Coordinates: 27°39′43″N 54°19′23″E
- Country: Iran
- Province: Fars
- County: Larestan
- District: Central
- Elevation: 802 m (2,631 ft)

Population (2016)
  - Total: 62,045
- Time zone: UTC+3:30 (IRST)
- Area code: 0715

Lar (Persian: لار) (Note: Also romanized as Lār; also known as Larestan) is a city in the Central District of Larestan County, (Note: Formerly Lar County) Fars province, Iran, serving as capital of both the county and the district.

== Ethnicity ==
Lar's inhabitants are Persians called Lari people.

=== Population ===
At the time of the 2006 National Census, the city's population was 51,961 in 12,891 households. The following census in 2011 counted 65,451 people in 16,528 households. The 2016 census measured the population of the city as 62,045 people in 18,578 households.

== History ==
The city was originally called Lar after the person who had first established the city. Lar (لار) is the name of one of Shahnameh's famous heroes. Around the 16th and 17th centuries, Lar was considered to be a major stop along the road to the Persian Gulf when it was under the Miladian dynasty.

In the early part of the 17th century, Lari people migrated to Arab states in the Persian Gulf in significant numbers, migrating to Qatar, the UAE, Bahrain, and Kuwait. Some have surname as "Lari" or "Al Lari" along with many other family and tribal names.

== Climate ==
Lar has a hot desert climate (BWh). Snowfall in Lar is a very rare event. It snowed in Lar in February 2017 for the first time in 50 years.

Climate data for Lar (1989-2010 normals)
Month	Jan	Feb	Mar	Apr	May	Jun	Jul	Aug	Sep	Oct	Nov	Dec	Year
Daily mean °C (°F)	11.4 (52.5)	14.1 (57.4)	17.7 (63.9)	23.3 (73.9)	29.1 (84.4)	32.8 (91.0)	34.9 (94.8)	33.9 (93.0)	30.1 (86.2)	24.7 (76.5)	18.3 (64.9)	13.4 (56.1)	23.6 (74.6)
Average precipitation mm (inches)	43.4 (1.71)	38.0 (1.50)	36.1 (1.42)	8.2 (0.32)	0.4 (0.02)	3.7 (0.15)	9.4 (0.37)	5.8 (0.23)	3.6 (0.14)	2.9 (0.11)	3.6 (0.14)	50.1 (1.97)	205.2 (8.08)
Average relative humidity (%)	61	54	50	36	27	25	31	32	33	33	41	54	40
Mean monthly sunshine hours	224.0	223.3	248.3	287.7	342.3	353.2	327.8	316.8	303.6	304.6	263.7	235.7	3,431
Source: IRIMO (temperature), (precipitation), (humidity 1989-2005), (sunshine 1989-2005)

== Civilization ==
Lar city is divided into two areas:

- New City, called Shahr-e Jadid,
- Old City, called Shahr-e Qadim.

The New City, which was constructed after the historical earthquake of 1960, now accommodates the main population and is considered to be modern in terms of civil and transport engineering (e.g. dead-ends are very rare).

The Old City contains the Bazaar of Qaisariye, a pre-Safavid dynasty creation, that was proposed as a UNESCO World Heritage Site on August 9, 2007.

== Transport ==
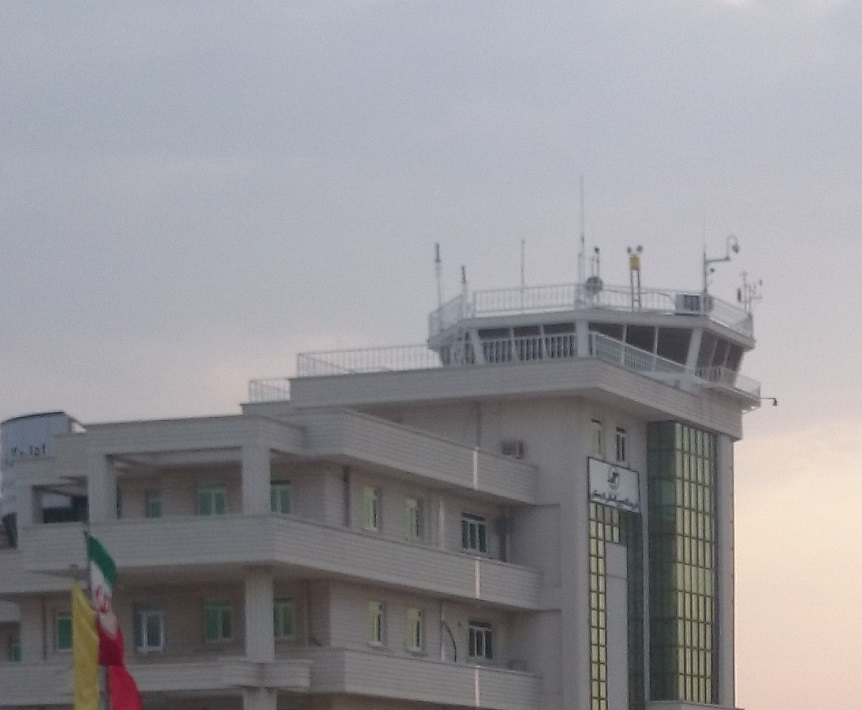
Larestan International Airport

As the Department of Roads and Transport and some other centres are situated in city of Lar, an interesting aspect of it is building and construction of a modern expressway between the city of Lar and a police station 10 km from the city of Gerash, but in the cost of cutting most spending from other town and villages' roads in the region and it costs human life in the road accidents in the regions which happens almost daily and have high fatality rates.

The 6-lane expressway has been fully upgraded with high luminous lighting and high quality pavement to facilitate the transportation needs of people of Lar town but the cost is paid by cutting almost all other funds for repairs and making new roads in the area who are governed by Lar Road and Transport Department in Lar.

Lar has an airport with daily flights to domestic and international destinations including Tehran, Dubai, Kuwait, Doha, Sharjah, etc.

== Gallery ==
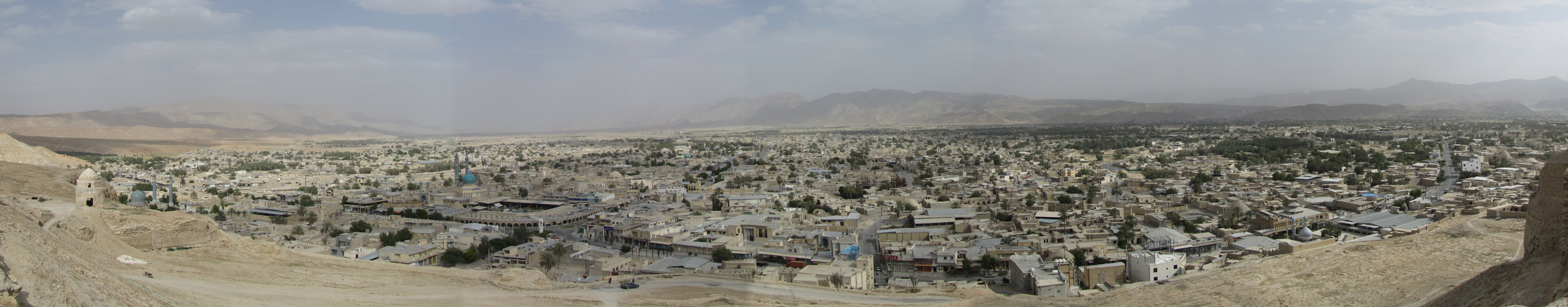
Panorama of the old town, from the old castle

== See also ==
- Lari language
- Larestan
- Fars province
