= Ansari (Panipat) =

The Ansaris of Panipat are descended from Khwaja Abdullah Pir of Herat, one of whose descendants settled in Panipat, which was a centre of learning and was already famous for its Mashaikh and Auliya.

== History ==
According to Tazkiratus Saleheen of Muhammad Abdul Aleem, Khwaja Malik Ali son of Birak Shah, the King of Herat, who was a descendant in the seventeenth generation of Khwaja Abdullah Ansari through his son Muhammad Khwaja. the Panipat Ansaris, or Helpers of the Prophet, who trace their descent from Khwaja Abdula Pir of Hirat, one of whose children, Khwaja Malak, in the reign of Sultan Alaudin Musud, the grandson of Abdullah Ansari, migrated to Dehli, and finally fixed his abode at Panipat. Khwaja Malik Ali was also assigned to become the Qazi of Panipat during this time.

== Modern Era ==
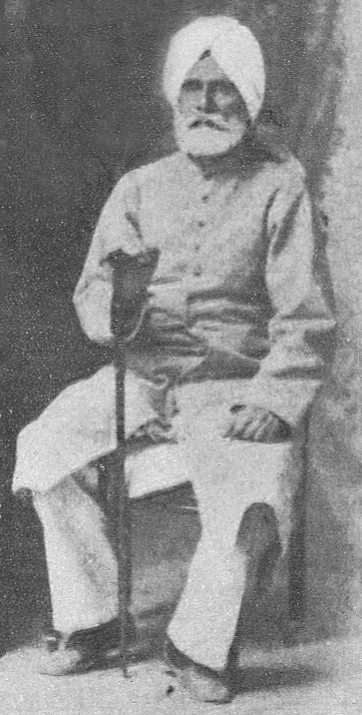
Altaf Hussain Hali of Panipat

The Ansaris of Panipat intermarry with the Pir families and Makhdum families of Panipat and the Syeds of Barsat and Sonepat. The Urdu poet and writer, Altaf Hussain Hali, was born in Panipat as a descendant of the Ansaris. Pakistani nationalist scholars consider his Musaddas-e Hali as an important text leading to the development of Pakistani nationalism. He also wrote the Yadgar-e Ghalib, Hayat-e Saadi, and Hayat-e Javed, which were biographies of Ghalib, Saadi, and Syed Ahmed Khan respectively.

== Mughal Empire ==
The Ansaris of Panipat held high offices during Muslim rule for several generations.

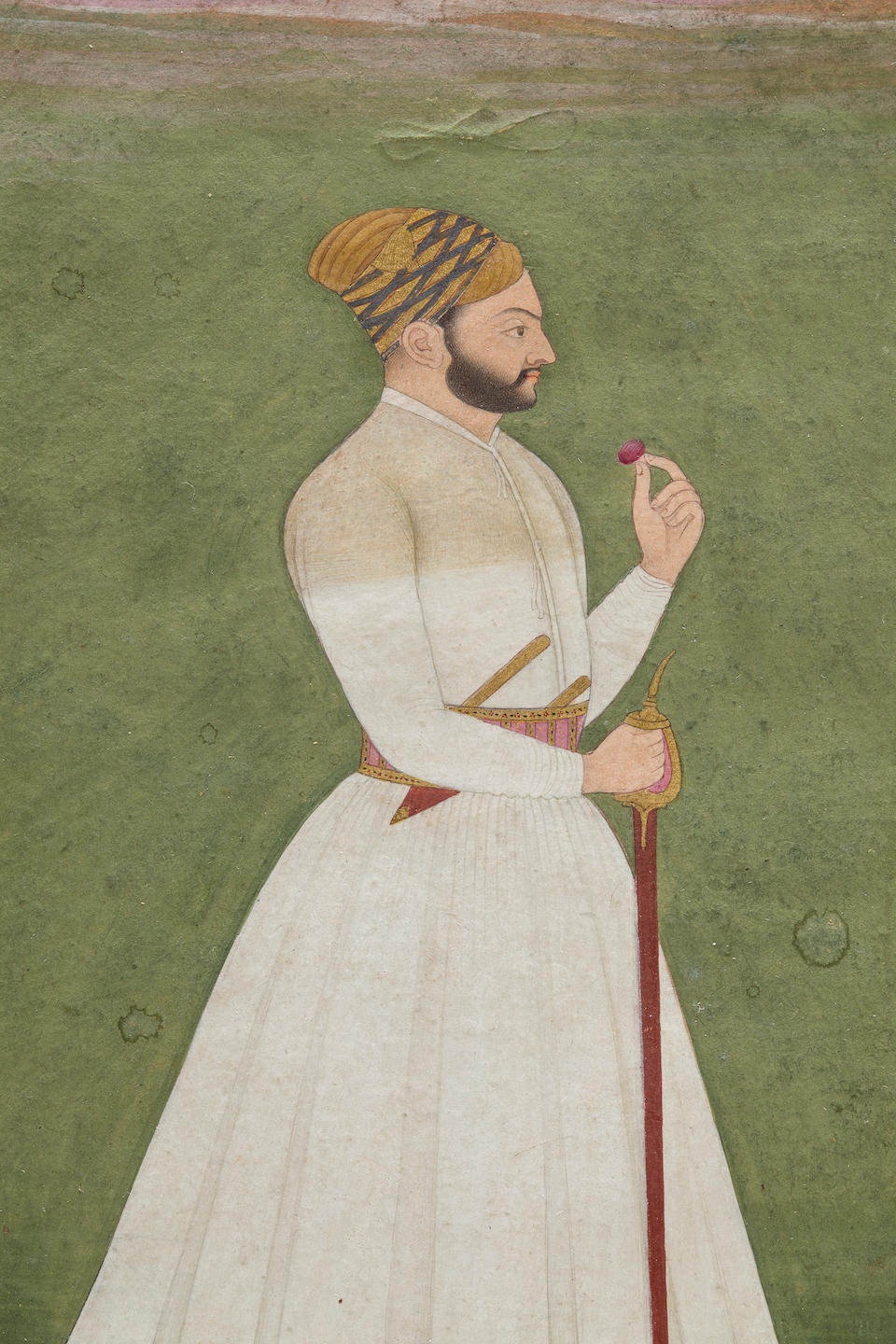
A portrait of Lutfullah Khan Sadiq

=== Lutfullah Khan Sadiq ===
Shams ud-Daulah Lutfullah Khan Panipati was the wakil of Prince Jahan Shah in Bahadur Shah's time, and deserted him during the War of Succession, gaining the favour of Jahandar Shah. Lutfullah Khan enjoyed the confidence of Farrukhsiyar through flattery, but worked hand in glove with the Sayyid brothers. The Syed brothers considered him to be a source of mischief and deprived him of his rank, and his gardens and mansions were confiscated. As the Mir-i-Saman of Muhammad Shah and later Diwan-i-Khalisa, Lutfullah Khan enjoyed the confidence of the Emperor and enjoyed great influence at court. He succeeded his brother Sher Afgan Khan as governor of Multan. He was later the governor of Shahjahanabad. In spite of having so much wealth, he seized the lands of poorer and weakened people all around Panipat, and had converted them into agricultural lands over an area of 12 km. This was an evidence of the rustic habits and tastes of the noble of this dignified rank. He was known as "Sadiq" or truthful in appreciation of and respect for the fame of his homeplace, Panipat.

=== Sher Afgan Khan Panipati ===
Sher Afgan Khan of Panipat was the governor of Multan in the reign of Muhammad Shah. His son was married to the daughter of the Mughal Grand vizier Turrah Baz Khan, another native of Panipat. At court the Mughal Vizier relied on him to support his own faction at court, which was opposed to Khan-i Dauran, an Indian Muslim from Agra who was the Commander-in-Chief of the Mughal empire.

=== Zakariya Khan ===
Zakariya Khan Bahadur was a descendant of the Ansaris. Originally governor of Jammu, he took part in the expeditions against the Sikhs. Zakariya Khan was the governor of Lahore at the time of Nader Shah's invasion.

=== Diler Dil Khan ===
Moin ud-Daulah Diler Dil Khan, originally Khwaja Abdullah, was the son of Khwaja Abdur Razzaq of Panipat. He is mentioned in the Siyar-ul-Mutahkerin as "Dilere Khan, of Puniput, brother of Zakariah Khan Sadik". He had the mansab of 6000, and was the governor of Thatta and Kabul during the reign of Muhammad Shah. From 1735 to 1738, he was governor of Kashmir.

=== Yahya Khan ===
Yahya Khan, the son of Zakariya Khan, succeeded his father as governor of Lahore.
