= Mukhlis =

Mukhlis is a surname and given name. People with the name include:

- Mukhlis Nakata
- Anand Ram Mukhlis
- Hamdullah Mukhlis
- Mawlud Mukhlis
- Khalil Ahmad Mukhlis
- George Mukhlis
