= Nader Shah's invasion of India =

Persian Invasion of Mughal Empire (1738–1739)

Afsharid invasion of India
- Part of the Naderian Wars and decline of the Mughal Empire
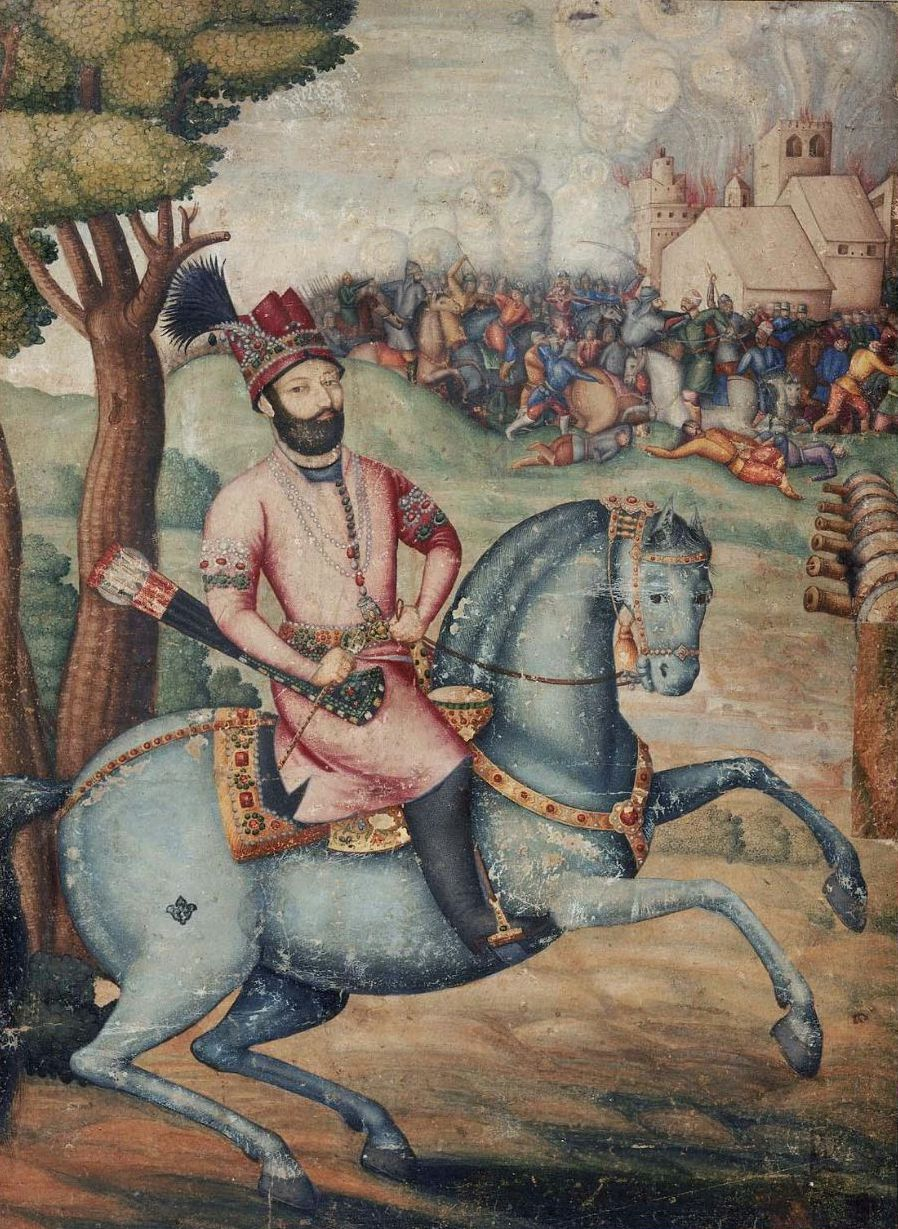
- Equestrian portrait of Nader Shah during the sack of Delhi. Created in Isfahan, dated c. 1740–1745
| Date | 10 May 1738 – 16 May 1739 (1 year and 6 days) |
| Location | Northern Indian subcontinent |
| Result | Persian victory (Note: "Despite the defeat at Karnal and the triumphal entry of the Persians, the inhabitants of Delhi were not overawed by their conquerors at first.") (Note: "Another significant incident marked the reception. The intrigues of Sa’adat Khan, the governor of Awadh (Oudh), and the Emperor’s other senior nobles, including the Nezam ol-Molk (the regent or viceroy of the Deccan) had done much to weaken the Moghul State prior to the Persian invasion. Sa’adat Khan’s rashness had led directly to the disastrous Moghul defeat at the battle of Karnal on 24 February, and his own capture."): Delhi massacred, sacked and looted |
| Territorial changes | Nader Shah (Note: "Nader may well have intended, despite his reinstatement of Mohammad Shah before his departure from Delhi, that he or one of his sons would return to India at a later stage and establish permanent Persian rule there. His annexation of the former Moghul territories west of the Indus, confirmed before he left Delhi, would have facilitated this, as would his naval expansion in the Persian Gulf.") annexes all lands west of the Indus river and establishes hegemony over the region |

Belligerents
| Afsharid Iran: Kingdom of Kakheti | Mughal Empire: Hyderabad State; Oudh State |

Commanders and leaders
| Nader Shah; Morteza Mirza Afshar; Ahmad Shah Abdali; Heraclius II of Georgia | Muhammad Shah (surrendered); Zakariya Khan Bahadur; Asaf Jah I Saadat Ali Khan I |

In May 1738, Nader Shah of Iran, the founder of the Afsharid dynasty, invaded Northern India, eventually sacking Delhi in March 1739. His army easily defeated the crumbling Mughals at the Battle of Karnal and then occupied the Mughal capital.

Nader Shah's victory against the weak and crumbling Mughal Empire in the far east meant that he could afford to turn back and resume war against Persia's archrival, the neighbouring Ottoman Empire, as well as launch further campaigns in the North Caucasus and Central Asia.

== Prelude ==
By the end of 1736, Nader Shah had consolidated his rule over Iran and dealt with the internal uprisings that had developed over the three years before that. He now shifted his focus towards the Afghan Ghilji tribe, who had been reorganised by their new leader Hussain Hotak (r. 1725–1738), a cousin of Ashraf Hotak. By the middle of the 1730s, Hussain Hotak had built up a substantial power base as the ruler of Herat and had been striving for some years to weaken Nader Shah's authority over present-day Afghanistan. By April 1737, Nader Shah had gone east and established his camp at a location close to the city Kandahar, where he ordered the construction of a city named Naderabad. He soon defeated Hussain Khan and captured Kandahar, thus putting an end to the Ghilji tribe's dominance. On 21 May 1738, Nader Shah left Naderabad and marched towards the city of Kabul, a garrison of 20,000 surrendering subsequently. On 11 June, he reached Ghazni after crossing the traditional border between Iran and the Mughal Empire.

At first, Nader Shah told the Mughals that he had no issues with them and he only moved into their domain to look for runaway Afghans. According to some contemporary Indian sources, the Mughal vassals plotting to weaken the authority of their suzerain were the reason behind Nader Shah's invasion of the Indian subcontinent. According to the Iranologist Laurence Lockhart, Nader Shah understood that he could fund his aspirations of expansion "with the spoils of India" because "the almost continual campaigns of the past few years had caused famine in Persia and brought her to the verge of bankruptcy." However, another Iranologist, Ernest S. Tucker, argues that "Long before the 1730s, though, Iran had already been in a state of financial crisis, partly because of the continued steady decline in Iranian exports that had caused a substantial reduction in state revenues." According to the Iranologist Michael Axworthy, the aim of the invasion was because Nader Shah "needed a breathing space, for the country to recover, and a new source of cash to pay the army, before he renewed his attack on the Ottomans."

By the start of the 18th century, the Mughals were struggling with a number of political issues. India started to fragment after the death of the Mughal Emperor Aurangzeb in 1707, eventually becoming a collection of kingdoms ruled by individuals who claimed nominal allegiance to the Mughal Emperor Muhammad Shah (r. 1719–1748), but essentially acted as independent rulers. Another political danger was the expansion of the Maratha Empire under Bajirao I. By challenging long-held beliefs about the necessity of Muslim political power in India, the Marathas presented a unique challenge to Mughal rule. By the beginning of the 18th century, the Indian subcontinent was still a huge and prosperous agricultural economy, but becoming more and more divided, making it an alluring target for a conqueror short on finance.

== Invasions ==
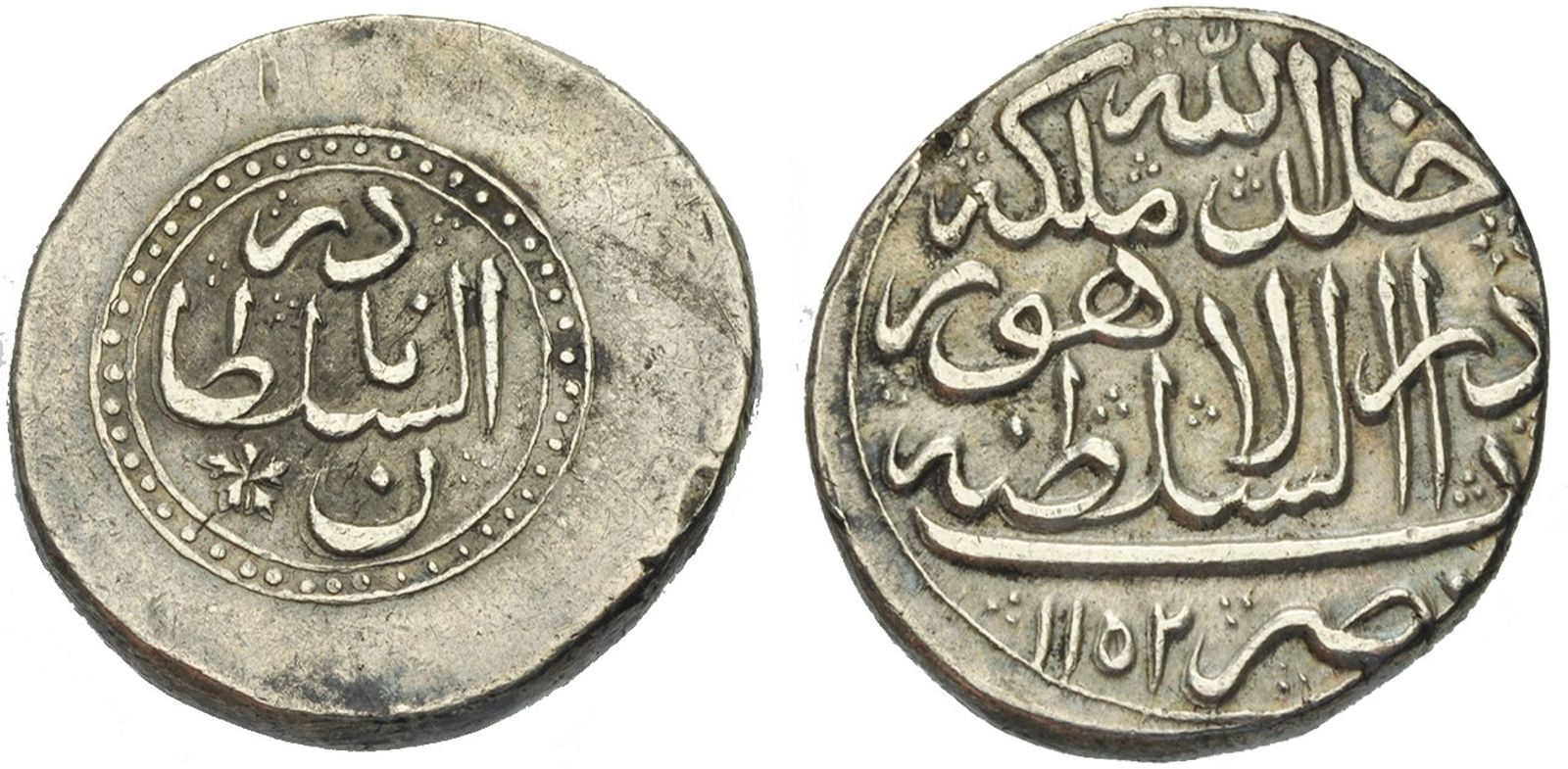
Afsharids. Nadir Shah. As king, AH 1148-1160, AD 1736-1747. AR Double-Rupi (26.5mm, 22.96 g, 9h). Lahore mint. Dated AH 1152 (AD 1739–40). Near EF.

Nader Shah crossed Mughal territory at the Mukhur spring and halted at Qarabagh, south of Ghazni. A detachment was sent under Nader's son, Nasrullah, to attack the Afghans of Ghorband and Bamian. When the governor of Ghazni fled upon hearing of Nader's approach, the Qadi, scholars and rich men of Ghazni gave the invaders presents and submitted to Nader when he entered on 31 May. Meanwhile, the other detachment had defeated the Afghans, pardoning all who surrendered, and exacting cruel punishment on those who resisted.

=== Conquest of Kabul ===
With his flank secure, Nader was free to march on Kabul. The chief men of the city tried to give in peacefully, but Sharza Khan decided to give resistance. On 10 June, Nader reached the city and the garrison sallied out to try and attack Nader's Army, who then just retreated to a safe distance where they could besiege the city. Nader arrived on the 11th and surveyed the city's defences from atop the Black Rock. The garrison tried to attack again, but were driven out by the Nader's Army. The city was besieged for a week until on 19 June, the tower of Aqa-bin collapsed, and the citadel capitulated.

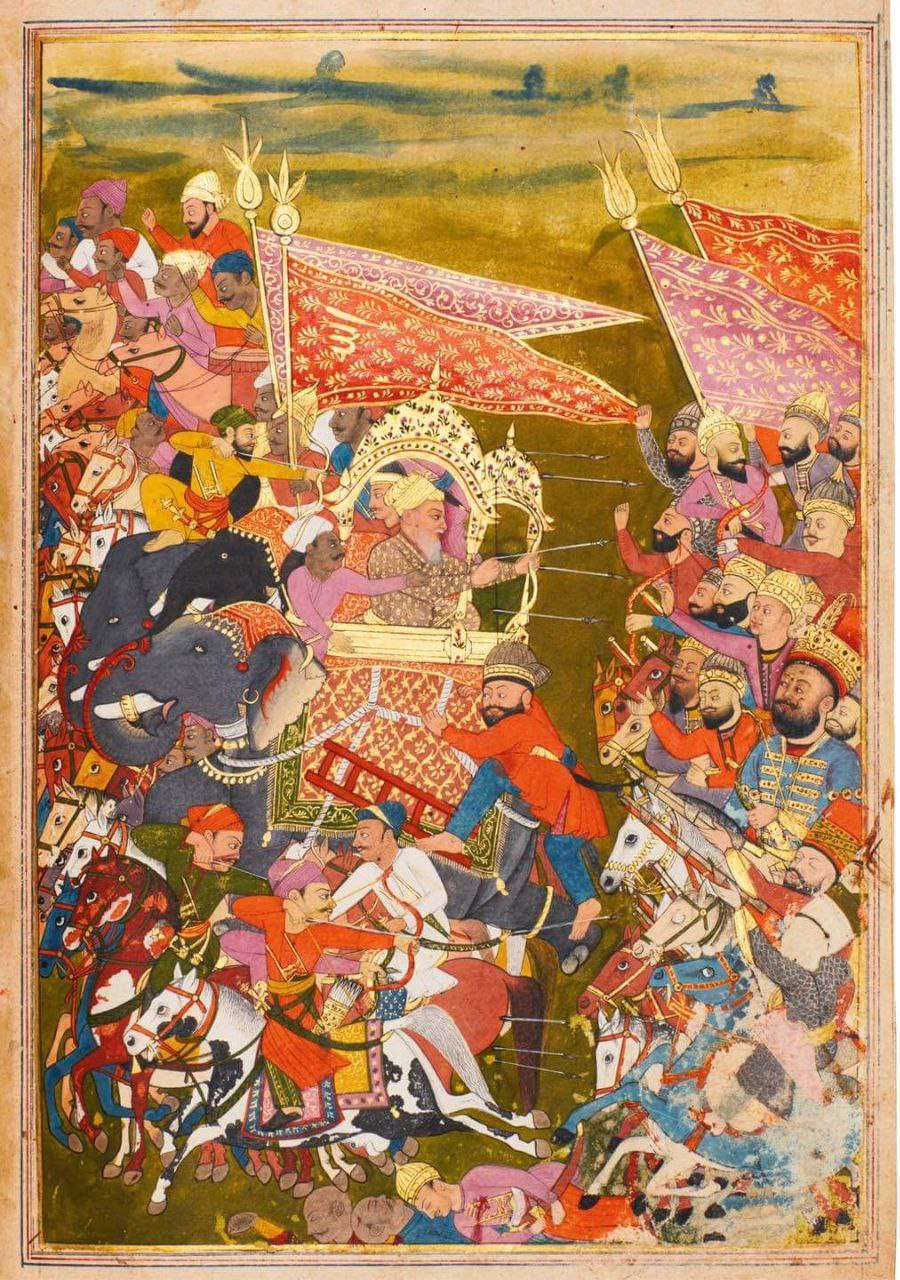
An illustrated page of a copy of the Jahangosha-ye Naderi, showing Nader Shah fighting the Mughal army. Created in northern India in 1757/58

Nader settled down in Kabul to handle the province's affairs. He received word that the Mughal Emperor would not receive Nader's letter to him, nor would he let his ambassador leave. In response, he sent an envoy to the imperial court, and expressed that his only wish was to do the Mughals a favour and rid them of the Afghans; how they had done more damage to India, and that the Kabul garrison's hostility forced him to fight them. The envoy sent to deliver the letter was turned back at Jalalabad, and then murdered by a neighbouring chieftain.

While this was going on, Nader left Kabul due to lack of supplies and started for Gandamak on 25 August. The Afsharid force reached Jalalabad and sacked the city on 7 September in revenge for the murder of Nader's courier. Nader sent his son, Reza to Iran (3 November).

=== Conquest of Punjab ===
On 6 November, the march through India was resumed. Nasir Khan, the Mughal governor of Kabul Subah, was in Peshawar when he heard of Nader Shah's invasion. He hastily assembled some 20,000 poorly trained tribal levies that would be no match for Nader's veteran soldiery. Nader marched swiftly through the steep path and outflanked the Mughal army at the Khyber Pass and annihilated it. Three days after the battle, Nader occupied Peshawar without resistance.

On 12 December, they resumed marching. They built a bridge over the Indus River by Attock and crossed the Chenab near Wazirabad on 8 January 1739. In the Battle of Karnal on 24 February 1739, Nader led his army to victory over the Mughals. Muhammad Shah surrendered and both entered Delhi together. The keys to the capital of Delhi were surrendered to Nader. He entered the city on 20 March 1739. The next day, Nader Shah held a durbar in Delhi.

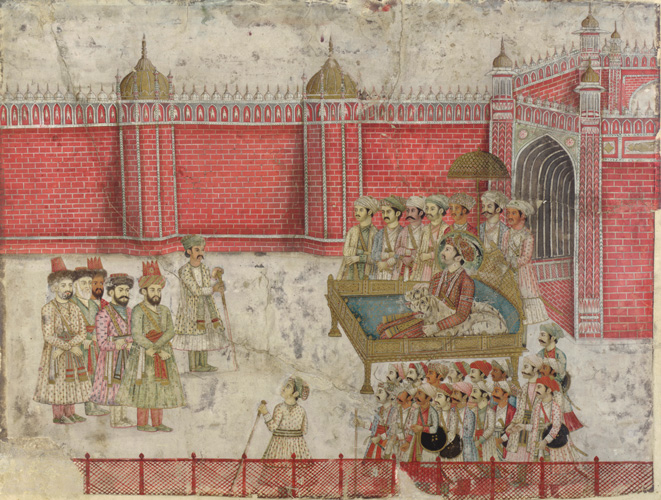
The Mughal Emperor's envoy and the Afsharid invaders negotiate.
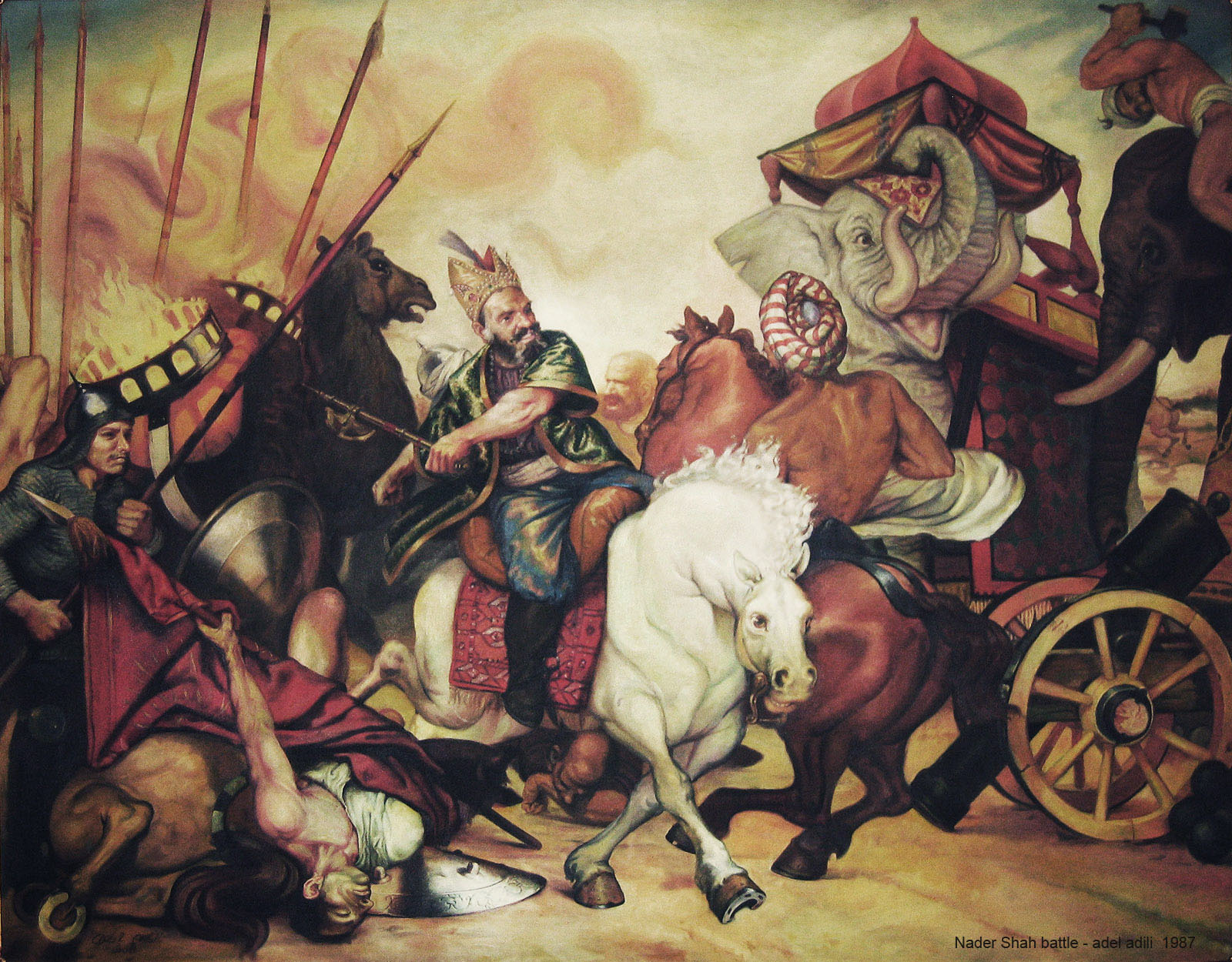
A portrayal of Nader Shah in the battle of Karnal by Adel Adili
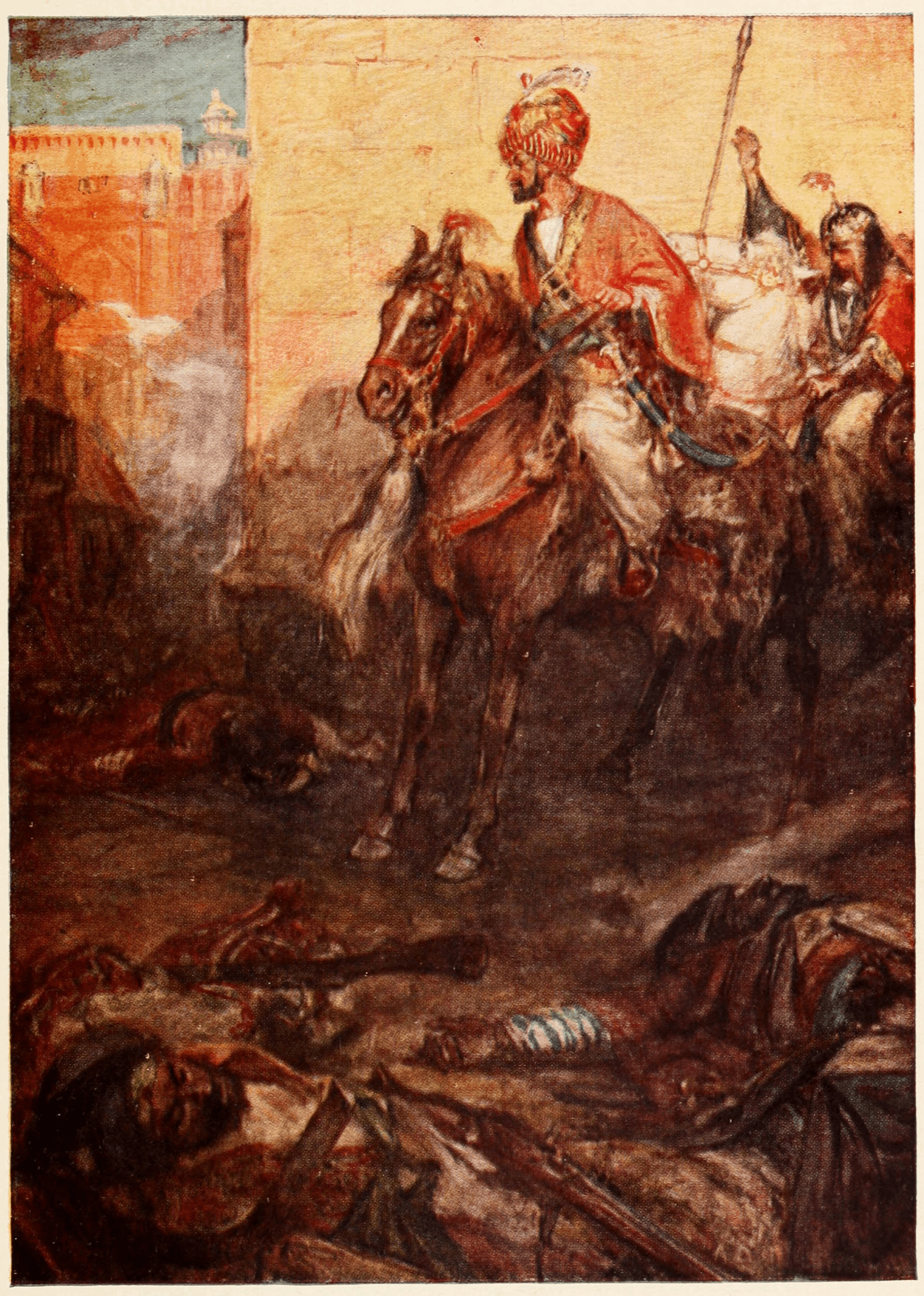
Nader Shah finds his troops had been killed in rioting. From Surridge, Victor (1909). Romance of Empire: India.

== Massacre of Delhi ==
The Afsharid occupation led to price increases in the city. The city administrator attempted to fix prices at a lower level and Afsharid troops were sent to the market at Paharganj, Delhi to enforce them. However, the local merchants refused to accept the lower prices and this resulted in violence during which some Afsharid troops were assaulted and killed.

When a rumour spread that Nader had been assassinated by a female guard at the Red Fort, some Indians attacked and killed 3,000 Afsharid troops during the riots that broke out on the night of 21 March. Nader, furious at the killings, retaliated by ordering his soldiers to carry out the qatl-e-aam (massacre – qatl = killing, aam = common public, in open) of Delhi.

On the morning of 22 March, Nader Shah sat at Sunehri Masjid of Roshan-ud-Daulah. Amid drums, trumpets, and the cheers of Afsharid troops, he brandished his sword to signal the onset of violence. The army turned their swords and guns on unarmed civilians in the city, and were given licence to do as they pleased and promised a share of plunder.

Areas of Delhi such as Chandni Chowk, Dariba Kalan, Fatehpuri, Faiz Bazar, Hauz Kazi, Johri Bazar and the Lahori, Ajmeri and Kabuli gates, all of which were densely populated by both Hindus and Muslims, were soon covered with corpses. Muslim inhabitants resorted to killing their women, children and themselves rather than submit to the Afsharid soldiers. These events were recorded in contemporary chronicles such as the Tarikh-e-Hindi of Rustam Ali, the Bayan-e-Waqai of Abdul Karim and the Tazkira of Anand Ram Mukhlis.

In the words of the Tazkira:

Here and there some opposition was offered, but in most places people were butchered unresistingly. The Persians laid violent hands on everything and everybody. For a long time, streets remained strewn with corpses, as the walks of a garden with dead leaves and flowers. The town was reduced to ashes.

Muhammad Shah was forced to beg for mercy.

After many hours of desperate pleading by the Mughals, Nader Shah relented and signalled a halt to the bloodshed by sheathing his battle sword once again...

== Casualties ==
It has been estimated that during the course of six hours in one day, 22 March 1739, approximately 20,000 to 30,000 Indian men, women and children were slaughtered by the Afsharid troops during the massacre in the city. Exact casualty figures are uncertain, as after the massacre, the bodies of the victims were simply buried in mass burial pits or cremated in grand funeral pyres without any proper record being made of the numbers cremated or buried. In addition, some 10,000 women and children were taken slaves, according to a representative of the Dutch East India Company in Delhi.

== Plunder ==
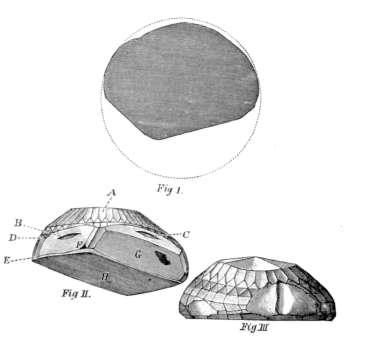
Tavernier's illustration of the Koh-i-Noor under different angles

The city was sacked for several days. An enormous fine of 20 million rupees was levied on the people of Delhi. Muhammad Shah handed over the keys to the Imperial Treasury, and lost the Peacock Throne, to Nader Shah, which thereafter served as a symbol of Persian imperial might. Amongst a treasure trove of other fabulous jewels, Nader also gained the Koh-i-Noor and Darya-i-Noor ("Mountain of Light" and "Sea of Light", respectively) diamonds; they are now part of the British and Iranian National Jewels, respectively. Nader and his Afsharid troops left Delhi on 16 May 1739, but before they left, he ceded back all territories to the east of the Indus, which he had overrun, to Muhammad Shah.

== Aftermath ==
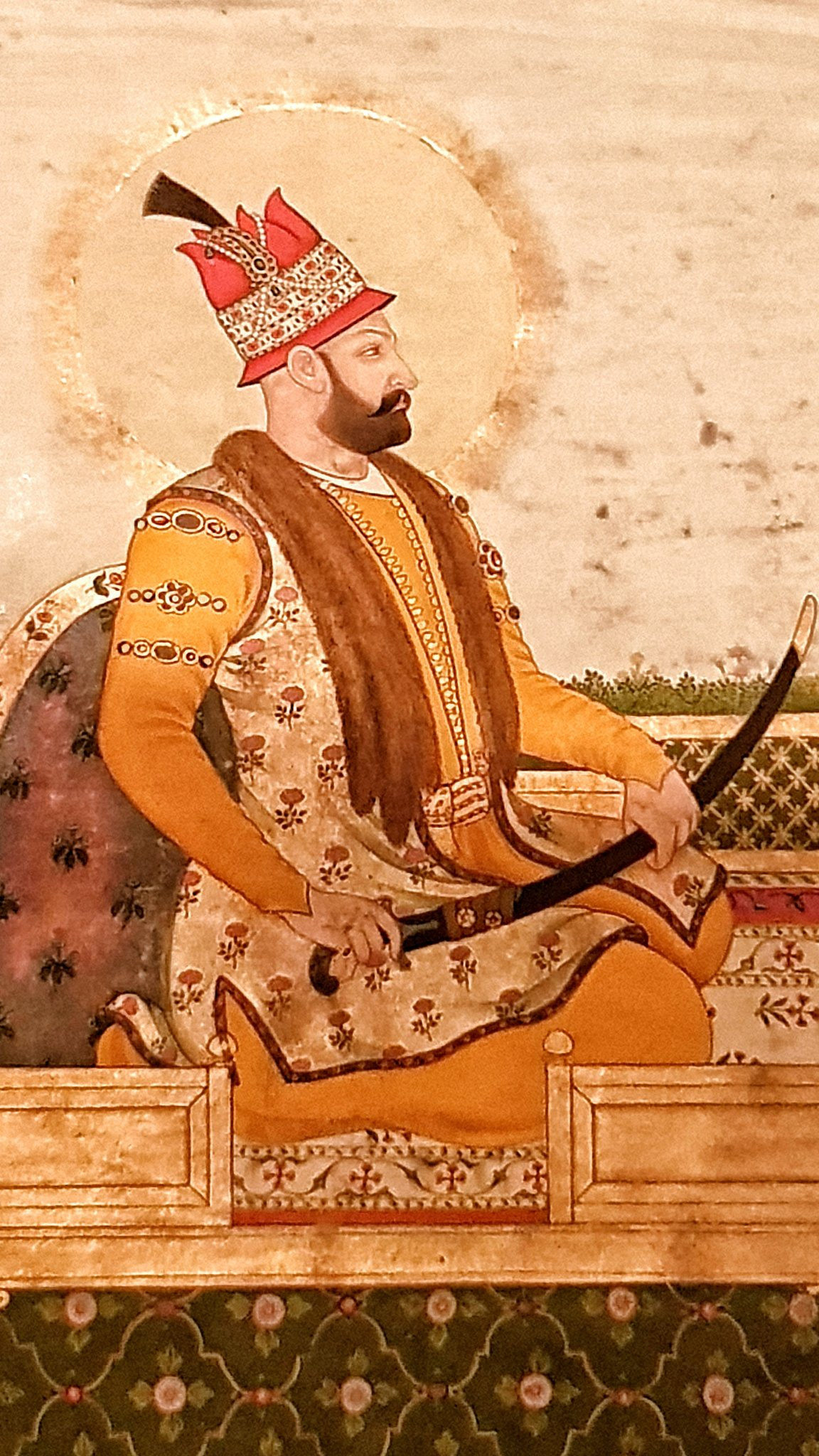
Painting of a nimbate Nader Shah in the Red Fort as a Mughal Emperor. Delhi, c. 1739

On Nader's return to Iran, Sikhs fell upon his army and seized a large amount of booty and freed the slaves in captivity and Nader's army could not pursue them successfully as they were oppressed by the scorching heat of May, and being overloaded with booty. But, still the yield of plunder seized from Delhi was so great that Nader stopped taxation in Persia for a period of three years following his return. The Governor of Sindh did not comply with Nader Shah's demands. Nader Shah's victory against the crumbling Mughal Empire in the East meant that he could afford to turn to the West and face the Ottomans. The Ottoman Sultan Mahmud I initiated the Ottoman–Persian War (1743–1746), in which Muhammad Shah closely cooperated with the Ottomans until his death in 1748. According to Axworthy, Nader's Indian campaign alerted the East India Company to the extreme weakness of the Mughal Empire and the possibility of expanding to fill the power vacuum. Michael Axworthy claims that without Nader:

eventual British rule in India would have come later and in a different form, perhaps never at all – with important global effects.

Nader's son, Nasrollah, married a Mughal princess after the sack.

== See also ==
- Indian campaign of Ahmad Shah Durrani

== Sources ==
- Axworthy, Michael (2006). The Sword of Persia: Nader Shah, from Tribal Warrior to Conquering Tyrant. I.B.Tauris. ISBN 978-1850437062.
- Babaie, Sussan (2018). "Nader Shah, the Delhi Loot, and the 18th-Century Exotics of Empire". In Axworthy, Michael (ed.). Crisis, Collapse, Militarism and Civil War: The History and Historiography of 18th Century Iran. Oxford University Press. pp. 215–234. ISBN 978-0190250331.
- John Clark Marshman (1863). "Nadir Shah". The History of India. Serampore Press. p. 199.
- Tucker, Ernest S. (2006). Nadir Shah's Quest for Legitimacy in Post-Safavid Iran. University Press of Florida. ISBN 978-0813029641.
