= Battle of Khyber Pass (1738) =

Battle between Iranian and Mughal empires

- Part of Nader Shah's invasion of India
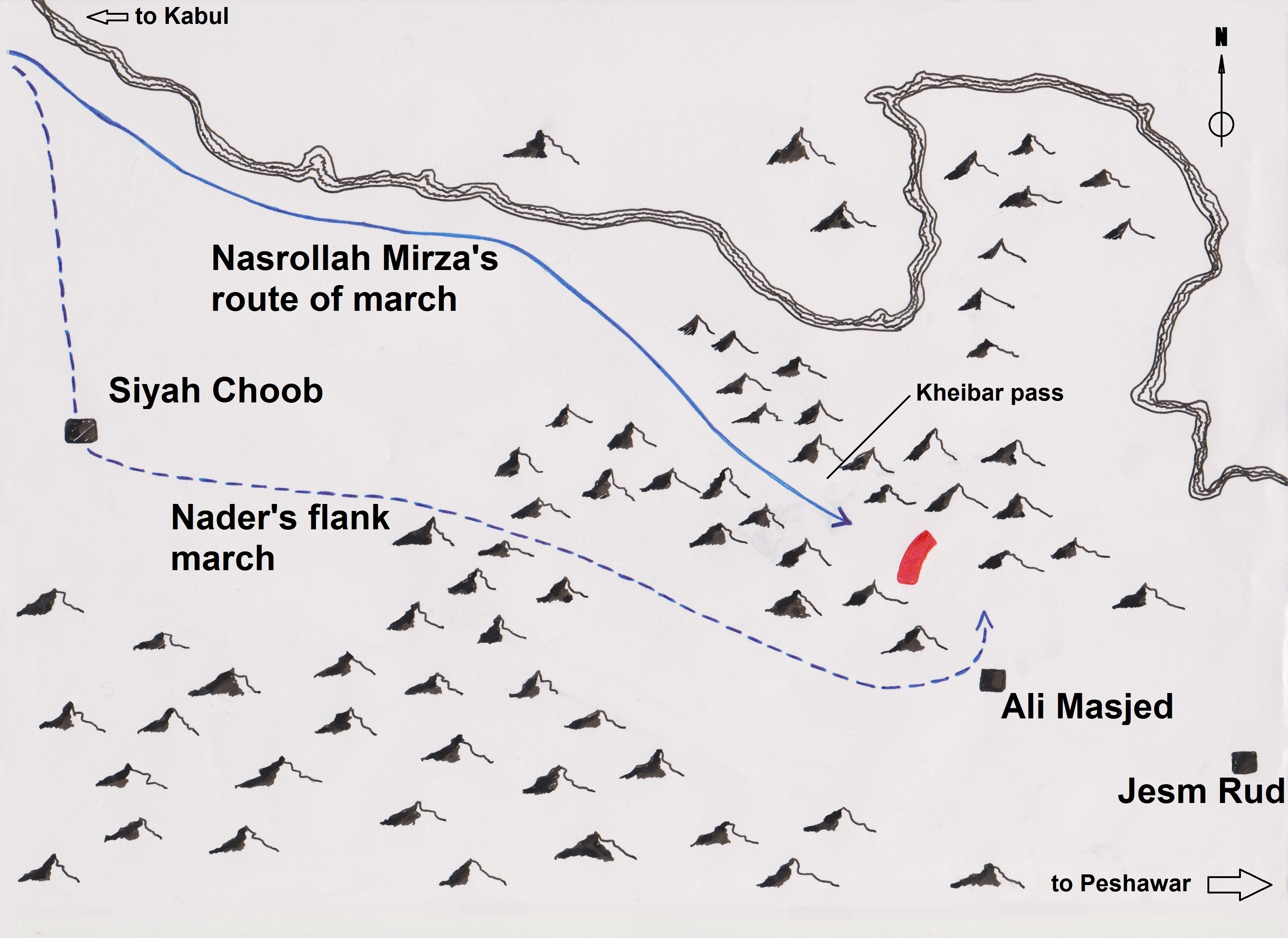
- A map of the Kheibar campaign, illustrating Nader's 80 kilometre flank-march
Date	26 November [O.S. 15 November] 1738
Location	Khyber Pass
Result	Afsharid victory (Note: "The Moghul forces were taken completely by surprise, but fought desperately for some time, until their commander and several other chiefs were captured.") (Note: He then circles around behind the Moghuls and defeats them in the battle of the Khyber Pass".)
Territorial changes	Invasion route into the Punjab region and North India opened.

Belligerents
Afsharid Iran	Mughal Empire

Commanders and leaders
Nader Shah; Morteza Mirza Afshar	Subahdar Nasir Khan (POW)

Strength
10,000 engaged in battle Total: 22,000: 10,000 (engaged) under Nader Shah; 12,000 (un-engaged) under Morteza Mirza Afshar	20,000; 50,000

Casualties and losses
Light	Majority of the forces killed and rest are captured and taken prisoner.

The Battle of Khyber Pass (Persian: نبرد تنگه خیبر) was an engagement fought on 26 November 1738 between the Afsharid Iran of Nader Shah and the Mughal vassal state of Peshawar. The result of the battle was an overwhelming victory for the Iranians, opening up the path ahead to invade the crown-lands of the Mughal Empire of Muhammad Shah.

== Background ==
On November 6, 1738, Nader Shah began his march towards India. After taking over northern Afghanistan, his main force moved past Jalalabad on the 12th and stopped about one mile outside the city. Then, a group of 12,000 select cavalry went ahead, followed by 6,000 men who guarded the royal tents. After that, the rest of the army, including the center and the rear, continued onward.

== Battle ==
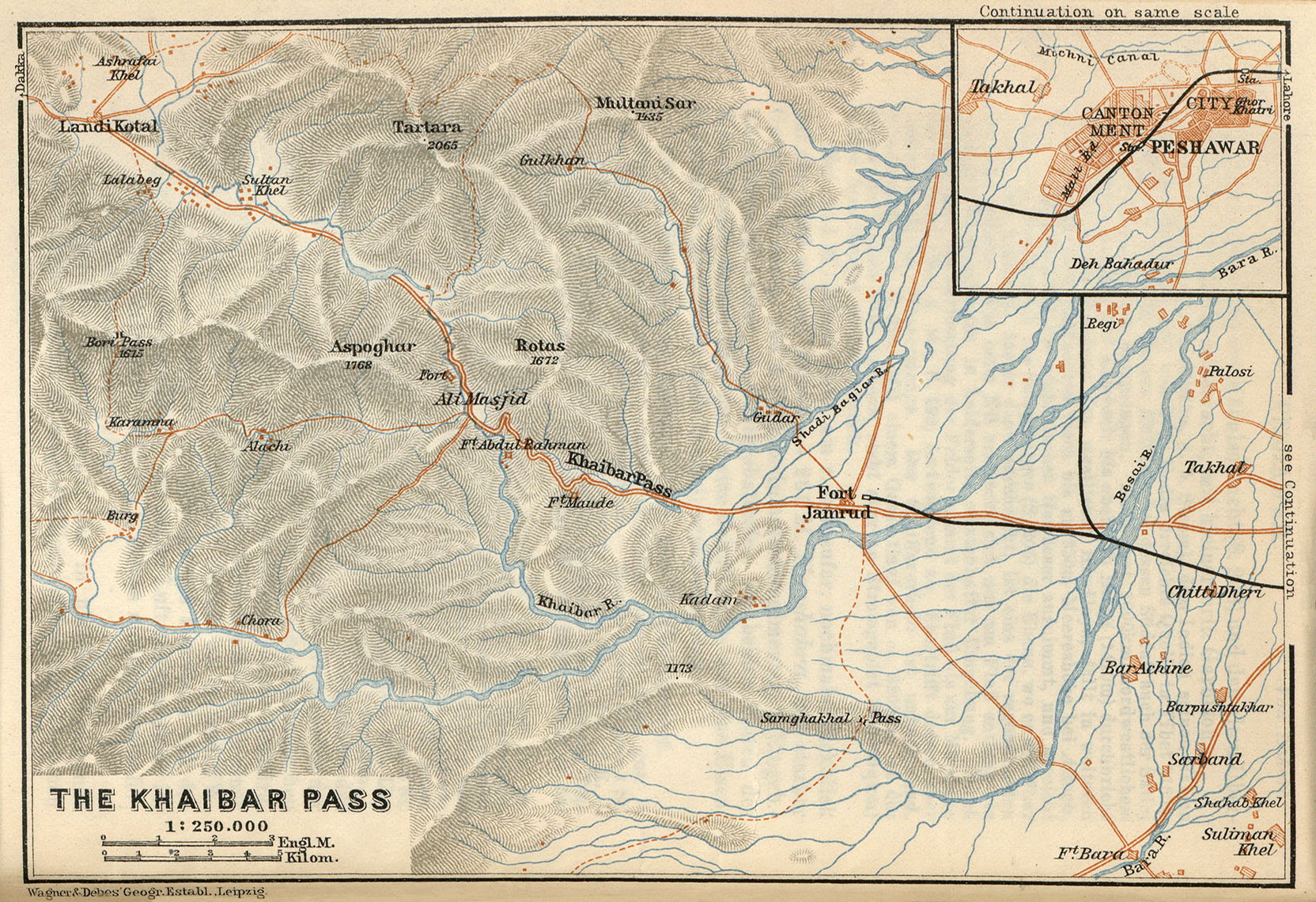
A 1914 map of Khyber Pass (center) and surrounding areas

Nasir Khan, the Mughal governor of Afghanistan, was in Peshawar when he learned that Nadir had taken Kabul and was planning to invade India. He quickly gathered about 20,000 Afghans from the Khaibar and Peshawar areas and blocked the only pass between Ali Masjid and Jamrud, which is 12 miles west of Peshawar. However, his soldiers, who were poorly fed and hastily recruited, could not match the experienced Iranian troops led by a celebrated general.

On the afternoon of November 14, after the asar prayer, Nader Shah left his camp at Barikab (about 20 miles from Jalalabad) under the command of Nasr-ullah Mirra. He set off with light baggage along the steep and rough Seh-chuba route. Remarkably, he covered 50 miles by 8 o’clock the next morning and launched a surprise flank attack on the Mughal army positioned in the Khyber Pass. A single charge by his forces scattered Nasir Khan’s untrained levies, though his regular soldiers fought on for a few hours. Ultimately, Nasir Khan and several nobles were captured, and the remainder of his army surrendered, leaving their camp and supplies to the victors.

== Aftermath ==
Three days later, the Iranian rearguard and camp arrived at the pass by the usual road. On November 18, Nadir entered Peshawar without facing any opposition and took over the governor’s palace. Then, on December 12, his advance continued. A strong detachment led by Aqa Muhammad was sent ahead to raid the area and construct a bridge over the Indus River at Attock. During this campaign, the Iranian forces crossed the other five rivers in the Panjab on foot, as they were shallow enough to ford. They crossed the Chenab River at Wazirabad, on January 8, 1739.

== See also ==
- Battle of Karnal

== Sources ==
- Axworthy, Michael (2009). The Sword of Persia: Nader Shah, from Tribal Warrior to Conquering Tyrant. I.B.Tauris.
- Bellamy, Christopher (1990). The Evolution of Modern Land Warfare: Theory and Practice.
- Ghafouri, Ali (2008). History of Iran's wars: from the Medes to now. Etela'at Publishing.
- Lockhart, Lawrence (1938). "Nadir Shah". The Geographical Journal. 92 (6): 550. Bibcode:1938GeogJ..92..550L. doi:10.2307/1788148. JSTOR 1788148.
- Moghtader, Gholam-Hussein (2008). The Great Battles of Nader Shah. Donyaye Ketab.
- Tucker, Spencer C., ed. (2010). A Global Chronology of Conflict: From the Ancient World to the Modern Middle East. Vol. II. ABC-CLIO.
