= Khan Dowran VII =

Mughal statesman and general (1672/1673–1739)

Samsam-ud-Daulah Khan Dauran VII

Mir Bakhshi of the Mughal Empire
- In office 8 October 1720 – 24 February 1739
- Monarch: Muhammad Shah
- Preceded by: Ihtisham-ul-Mulk
- Succeeded by: Nizam-ul-Mulk, Asaf Jah I

Subahdar of Gujarat
- In office 1717–1719
- Monarch: Farrukhsiyar
- Deputy: Haidar Quli Khan
- Preceded by: Ajit Singh
- Succeeded by: Ajit Singh

Subahdar of Agra
- Monarch: Farrukhsiyar
- Preceded by: Chabela Ram
- Succeeded by: Sadatullah Khan I

Personal details
- Born: Khawaja Asim; 1672/1673 Agra, Agra Subah, Mughal Empire
- Died: 24 February 1739 Karnal, Delhi Subah, Mughal Empire
- Relations: Muzaffar Khan (brother)
- Children: Mirza Ashraf
- Occupation: General, Subahdar

Military service
- Allegiance: Mughal Empire
- Branch/service: Mughal Army
- Battles/wars: Campaign against the Sayyid brothers; Battle of Hasanpur; Battle of Rampura: Afsharid-Mughal war; Battle of Karnal †; {{{2}}}

Khan Dowran VII (1672/73 – 24 February 1739) was a Mughal statesman and general in the eighteenth century. Originally Khwaja Asim, he was made Samsam ud-Daula (Sword of the State) Khan-i Dauran and was the Mir Bakshi and Amir-ul-Umara. He was the head of all the imperial nobility and the commander-in-chief of the Mughal army during the reign of Muhammad Shah, and served the Emperor until his death at the Battle of Karnal.

His brother, Muzaffar Khan, was the Mir-i-Atish (commander of the artillery), and the governor of Ajmer.

== Background ==
Khwaja Asim was an Indian Muslim, who was born in 1672–73 in Agra, where his father Khwaja Qasim was living in retirement after giving up his job in the army. He was a member of the Naqshbandi Khwajazadah family, who were natives of Agra. He was an ethnic Hindustani. When Khwaja Asim grew to manhood, he along with his brothers went to the Deccan in search of employment, and entered the service of Prince Kam Bakhsh who took him into service and raised him as a mansabdar. One author asserts that Khwaja Asim had been a play-fellow of prince Farrukhsiyar, but as he was at least eleven years older, this can hardly be correct. His intimacy with the Prince was founded, however, on joining him in wrestling, archery, riding, polo-playing and other war-like exercises, of which Farrukhsiyar was passionately fond.

Ashub says that his ancestor, Khan Baha-ud-Din Naqshband, had been the Pir and Murshid of all Turan and Turkistan.

== Life ==
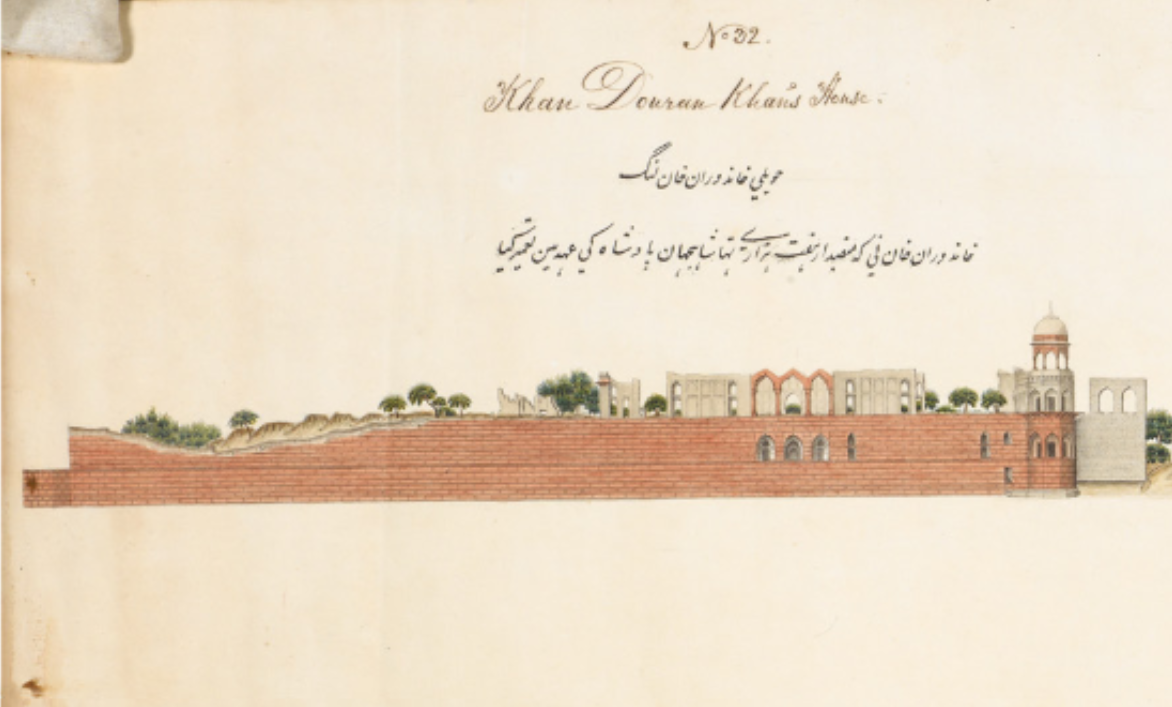
Khan-i Dauran Khan's House, Agra

When Farrukhsiyar rose as the heir to the throne, Khwaja Asim felt like a "falcon newly mounted". Farrukhsiyar attempted to raise Khan-i-Dauran as a favourite in order to establish independence from the rule of the Indian Muslim Sayyid Brothers. He was made a mansabdar of 7000/7000 zat and sowar, and was made the head of the Wala-Shahis, who were distinguished by their red turbans. When Sayyid Hussain Ali Khan was made the Viceroy of the Deccan and left to take personal charge of the provinces, the Sayyids agreed on the insistence of the Emperor to give Khan-i-Dauran the roles of the Mir Bakhshi as the deputy. In this period he was the governor of both Agra and Gujarat.

After the overthrow of the Sayyid Brothers, during which Khan-i Dauran fought Abdullah Khan at the Battle of Hasanpur, Khan-i-Dauran took Husain Ali Khan's place as Mir Bakhshi with the rank of 8000 zat and sowar, and was made the Amir-ul-Umara. He had success in driving Asaf Jah I away from the court to the Deccan, after which all power practically fell into the hands of the Mir Bakhshi, Khan-i-Dauran. From this point until his death in 1739, Khan-i-Dauran retained his position at court, whoever was in power. Khan-i-Dauran charged the next Wazir, Roshan-ud-Daulah, of corruption, which resulted in the dismissal of his post. He only employed Indian Muslims as soldiers. Ashub says that his patronage of Hindustanis resulted in the decline of the descendants of Irani and Turani servants of Azam Shah.

Khan-i-Dauran was the head of the Mughal army at the Battle of Karnal. During Nader Shah's invasion of the Mughal Empire, Muhammad Shah sent out a request for troops throughout his lands and gathered a large force to face the invaders. One of the Mughal nobles who answered the call of the Emperor was Khan Dowran, being appointed commander in chief of the Mughal army upon Muhammad Shah's request. After the arrival of a contingent of Mughal forces under the command of Sa'adat Khan, the rearguard of this reinforcing column came under attack from Persian skirmishes who looted the baggage. Sa'adat Khan set out in pursuit and was lured into battle.

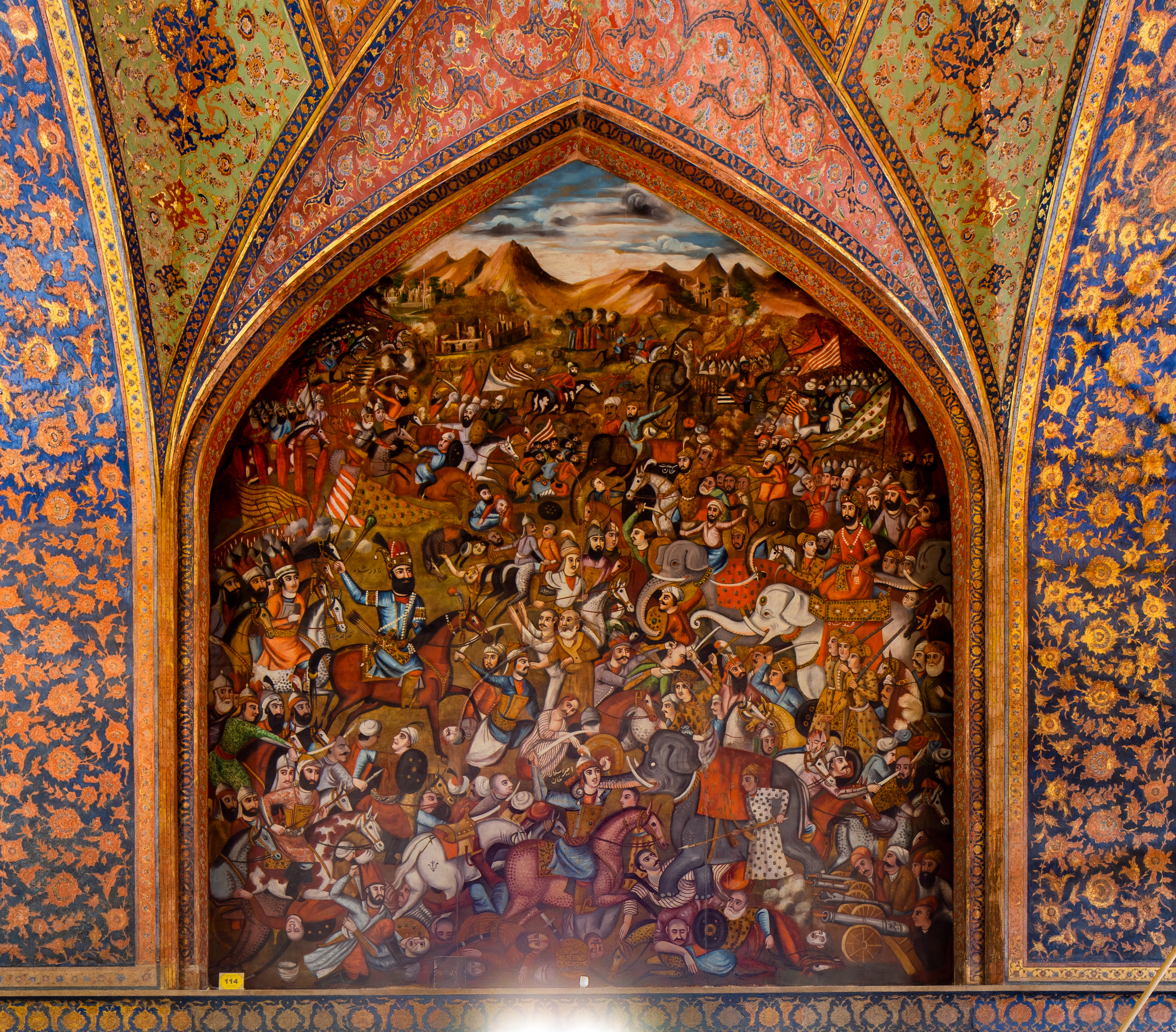
Depiction of the Battle of Karnal

After reports came into the Mughal camp, Muhammad Shah strongly favoured aiding Sa'adat Khan's troops but Khan Dowran advised caution, stating any aid given to Sa'adat khan would only involve a greater number of Mughal troops in Sa'adat Khan's defeat. After Muhammad Shah questioned his courage, Khan Dowran donned his armour and set out to link up with Sa'adat Khan. Khan-i Dauran declared that it was not the Indian style to abandon a friend, even if he was imprudent. However, Nader Shah sent out a number of troops to feign retreat and managed to separate Khan Dowran and Sa'adat Khan and defeat each in detail. Khan Dowran's soldiers were decimated and he himself was badly injured and died later that evening after being carried back to the Mughal camp by his retainers. Although Khan-i-Dauran had set out with his cavalry to engage the enemy, the rest of the army under the Nizam remained inert during battle, who, according to the Siyar-ul-Muhtakhrin, "probably hoped to take the places of these rivals at court if they perished". The Nizam had held a grudge on Khan-i Dauran, as the latter had likened his function to the dance of an old monkey from the Deccan, when the Nizam had come to court in his Deccan attire and made obeisance in the Mahratta fashion. The Mughal emperor himself also remained "imbecile and stood like a wooden figure", far away from the battlefield, "but more as a distant spectator of the battle rather than a participator in it". The wounded body of Khan-i-Dauran was brought back to the Mughal camp, where he regained consciousness and said in a weak voice, "I have myself finished my own business. Now you know and your work knows. Never take the Emperor to Nadir, nor conduct Nadir to Dihli, but send away that evil from this point by any means you can devise." He then relapsed into unconsciousness and died within two days. His brother Muzaffar Khan and elder son Muharram Khan were among the dead.

His younger son Mirza Ashraf Samsam-ud-Daula, who was made a captive by Nader Shah, was given the title of Khan-i Dauran and the post of Mir-i-Atish by Muhammad Shah, and became the Mir Bakhshi of Alamgir II with the title of Amir-ul-Umara.

== Personality ==
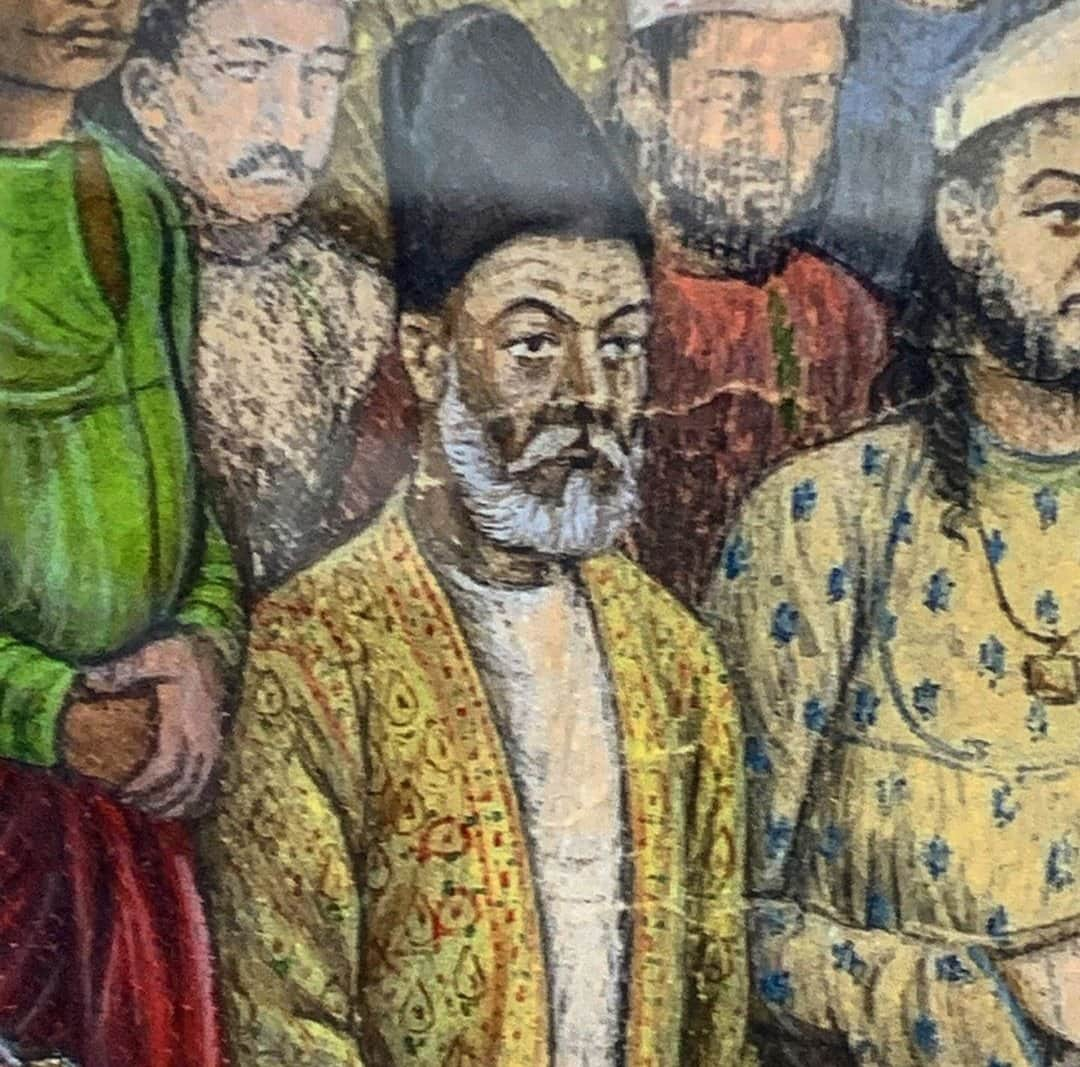
Scene from a Mushaira

Much of Khan-i-Dauran's prestige may have been derived from his commanding presence. A contemporary tells us that when he walked up the audience hall with a group of followers, his head would be seen towering far above the others.

Nawab Sadr-ud-Din Muhammad Khan Fa'iz, the first poet in Northern India who wrote a Diwan in Rekhta or Urdu in 1715, participated in Musha'irahs and academic gatherings at the residence of Khan-i-Dauran, and these he describes vividly in the Risala-i Manazrat. Khan-i Dauran was a man of smooth plausible speech, with little knowledge of Persian. Instead, Khan-i Dauran spoke an elegant Urdu, ornamented with Persian phrases. Khan-i Dauran thought it pretentious to use Persian in everyday conversation or at home; it left one open to ridicule and criticism. Khan-i Dauran also owned a big library. He fixed a daily allowance for the famous Urdu poet of the time, Mir Taqi Mir. Once he was pleased with a Kashmiri poet, Mullah Sata'i, and rewarded him with two thousand rupees. But the latter requested the Mir Bakhshi for a mansab, after which Khan-i Dauran brought him to recite a qasidah in court for the Emperor. The poet received a mansab, jagir, service in the province of Kashmir.

== See also ==
- Nader Shah
- Mughal Empire
- Muhammad Shah

== Bibliography ==
- Cust, Edward, Annals of the wars of the eighteenth century, Gilbert & Rivington Printers:London, 1862.
- Dupuy, R. Ernest and Trevor N. Dupuy, The Harper Encyclopedia of Military History, 4th Ed., HarperCollinsPublishers, 1993.
- Axworthy, Michael, "The Sword of Persia; Nader Shah, from Tribal Warrior to Conquering Tyrant", I B Tauris, 2009.
