= Panipat Taraf Ansar =

- Census town
- Location in Haryana, India Panipat Taraf Ansar (India)
- Coordinates: 29.41223°N 76.9547°E
- Country: India
- State: Haryana
- District: Panipat

Population (2001)
  - Total: 31,204

Languages
  - Official: Hindi
- Time zone: UTC+5:30 (IST)
- ISO 3166 code: IN-HR
- Vehicle registration: HR
- Website: haryana.gov.in

Panipat Taraf Ansar is a census town in Panipat district in the Indian state of Haryana.

== Demographics ==
As of 2001 India census, Panipat Taraf Ansar had a population of 31,204. Males constitute 55% of the population and females 45%. Panipat Taraf Ansar has an average literacy rate of 58%, lower than the national average of 59.5%: male literacy is 65%, and female literacy is 50%. In Panipat Taraf Ansar, 16% of the population is under 6 years of age.
