= Anand Ram Mukhlis =

Anand Ram Mukhlis Khatri Lahori (1699–1750) was an 18th-century chronicler, poet and lexicographer active in Persian. Originally from a Khatri family of Sialkot in Punjab, but based in Delhi, his grandfather Gajpat Rai had a high position in Mughal bureaucracy while his father Hirday Ram was a vakil of Amin Khan Turani at the court of Muhammad Shah.

After the death of Amin Khan, his successor Qamar ud-Din Khan appointed Mukhlis as his vakil. Mukhlis had also served as vakil of governors of Multan and Lahore during the time of invasion of Nader Shah. Mukhlis was a prolific writer and has left a large number of works, most important of which is Badāʾiʾ-i waqāʾiʾ, which is divided into three parts. First part is an eyewitness narration of Nader Shah's sack of Delhi; in second he gives first-hand report of Muhammad Shah's campaign against Ali Mohammed Khan Rohilla. Third concerns with the 1748 invasion of Ahmad Shah Abdali. His other notable works include Mir’āt al-Iṣt̤ilāḥ, on Persian lexicography, a Dīvān comprising ghazals and mathnavis, and a collection of letters named Ruqaʿāt i Mukhliṣ. Other works by Mukhlis include Chamanistān, a collection of anecdotes and witticism, Rāḥat al-faras, etc.
