= Roshan-ud-Daulah =

Mughal Empire figure

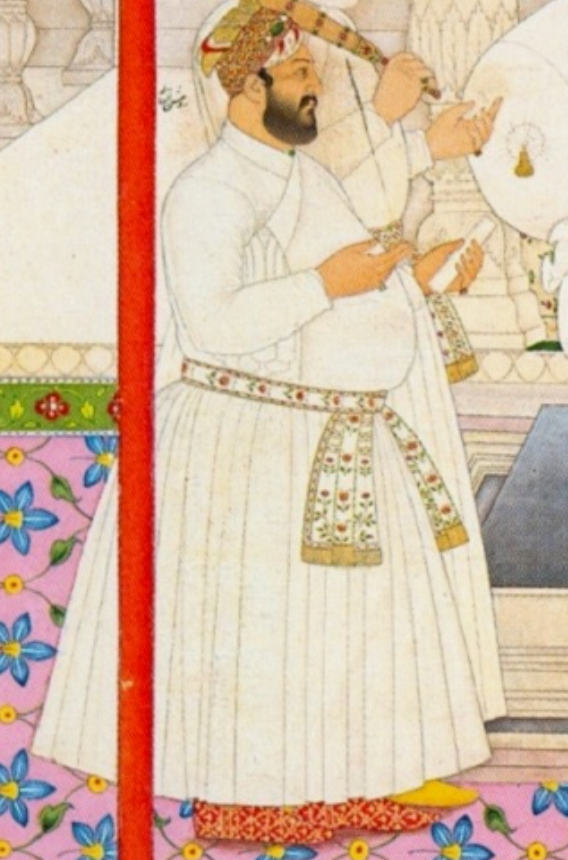
Roshan-ud Daula Zafar Khan

Roshan-ud-Daulah, known by his original name Khwaja Muzaffar Panipati and the title of Turra-i-Baz Roshan-ud-Daulah Zafar Khan, was the Grand Vizier of the Mughal Empire during the reign of Muhammad Shah. He was known by the nickname Turra-i-Baz (falcon's crest) as Roshan-ud-Daula and all his men wore their turbans in the same way, with an end sticking out.

== Biography ==
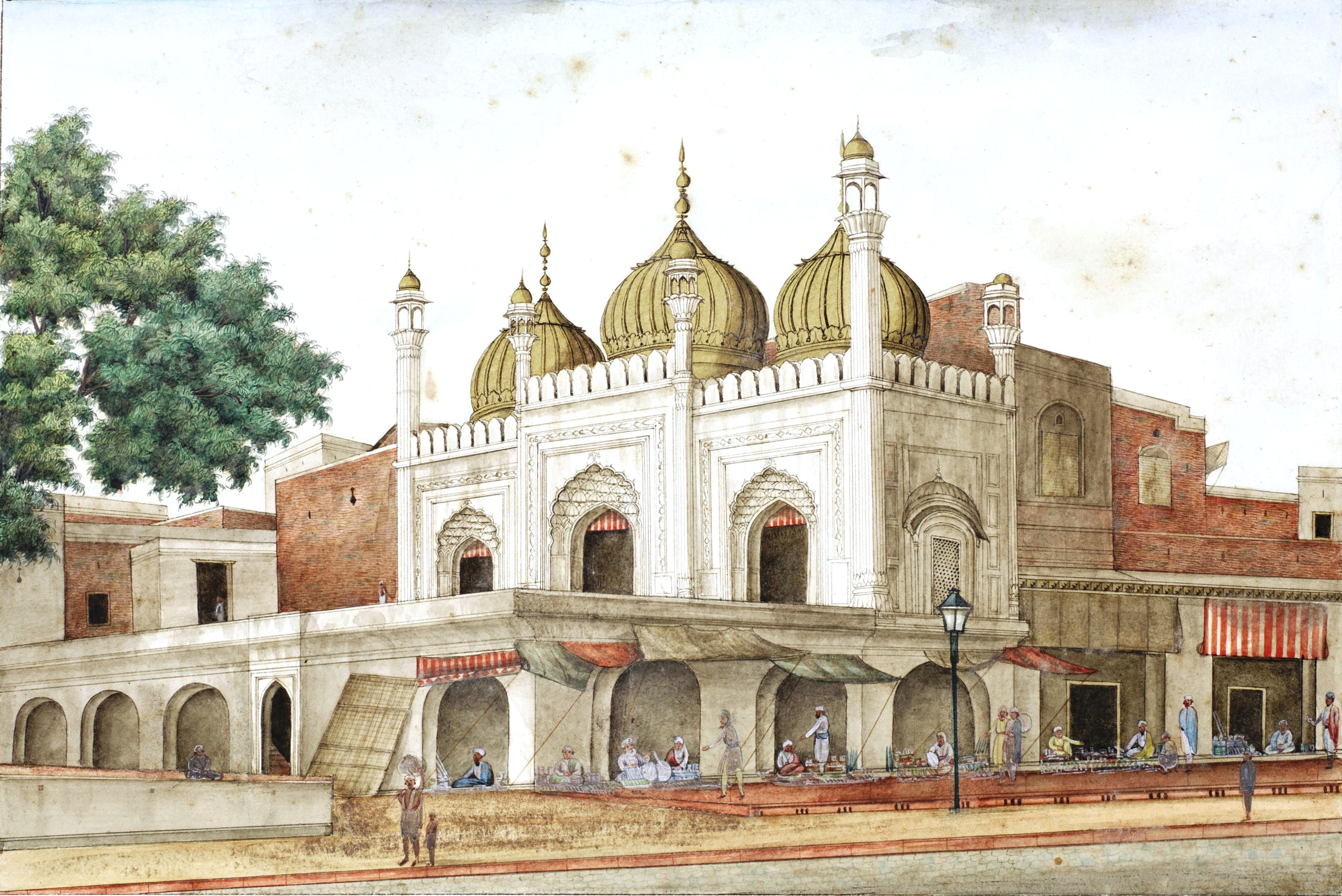
Masjid of Roshan ud-Dawla by the painter Ghulam Ali Khan

Roshan-ud-Daulah was an Indian Muslim descendant of the Naqshbandi Khwajas, and was a native of Panipat. His father, Khwaja Fathullah, was married to the sister of Sarbuland Khan, a Sayyid who was the Mir Bakhshi of Aurangzeb. His ancestors gained positions in the time of Aurangzeb as the religious mentality had turned in favour of the Naqshbandis and the seeds of Ahmad Sirhindi's teachings had grown both in the subcontinent and central asia.

In the reign of Farrukhsiyar, he replaced Khan-i Dauran in charge of the duties as the deputy Bakhshi of Ihtisham-ul-Mulk Barha the Mir Bakhshi, one of the Sayyid Brothers. He was part of Hussain Khan Barha's campaign against Ajit Singh and returned to court with the news of Ajit Singh's submission on May 1714, being rewarded with the title Fidwi-i-Farmanbardar. His daughter was married to the son of the Asaf Jah I, which was celebrated at Aurangabad. Another daughter was married to Banda Ali Khan, the daughter's son of Sher Afkan Panipati, the son of Abdur Razzaq Ansari. In 1718 he was the Bakhshi of the Ahadis, the personal guard cavalry of the Emperor Farrukhsiyar. He was friendly to the Sayyids, while at the same time professed to be zealous for the Emperor. He made all efforts he could to bring both parties to an agreement.

In the reign of Muhammad Shah, he was appointed Wazir succeeding Qamar-ud-Din, as Muhammad Shah resolved to break the power of the "Chin" group of nobles and had dismissed Qamar-ud-Din from Wizarat. Zafar Khan was the most powerful noble in Muhammad Shah's court, and part of the king's intimate circle of nobles along with Shah Abdul Ghafur of Thatta. According to Ashob, like Khan-i Dauran, Ashob considered himself an Indian Muslim, and his armed retinue and following consisted almost exclusively of Indian Muslims. Although he was a Hindustani, he formed his own faction with Sher Afkan Khan(brother of Lutfullah Khan Panipati), and did not side with the Indian Muslim Amir-ul-Umara, Khan-i-Dauran. He was related by marriage to the Nizam of Hyderabad, but did not side with him against Khan-i-Dauran. The new Wazir Roshan-ud-Daulah was disgusted at the dilly-dally approach of Muhammad Shah and his neglect in official duties. However, Zafar Khan was also a corrupt official.

Ashob states that Roshan-ud-Daulah had amassed more wealth than what the Pharaoh dreamed to possess, writing that Zafar Khan's house looked like a mountain of gold, and that it appeared as if streams of gold were flowing from productive lands of the empire into the villas of the nobles. He was later found guilty of misappropriation of funds and was dismissed from his post, after he was accused of corruption by the Amir-ul-Umara, Khan-i Dauran. along with his brother Fakhr-ud-Daula, the governor of Bihar. It is said that Muhammad Shah had also been suspicious of Roshan-ud-Daulah for his marriage alliance with the Nizam in the Deccan, which also contributed to his downfall. The faction of Roshan-ud-Daulah was supplanted by the clique of Khan-i-Dauran Samsam-ud-Daulah and his brother Muzaffar Khan until their deaths at 1739.

== Works ==
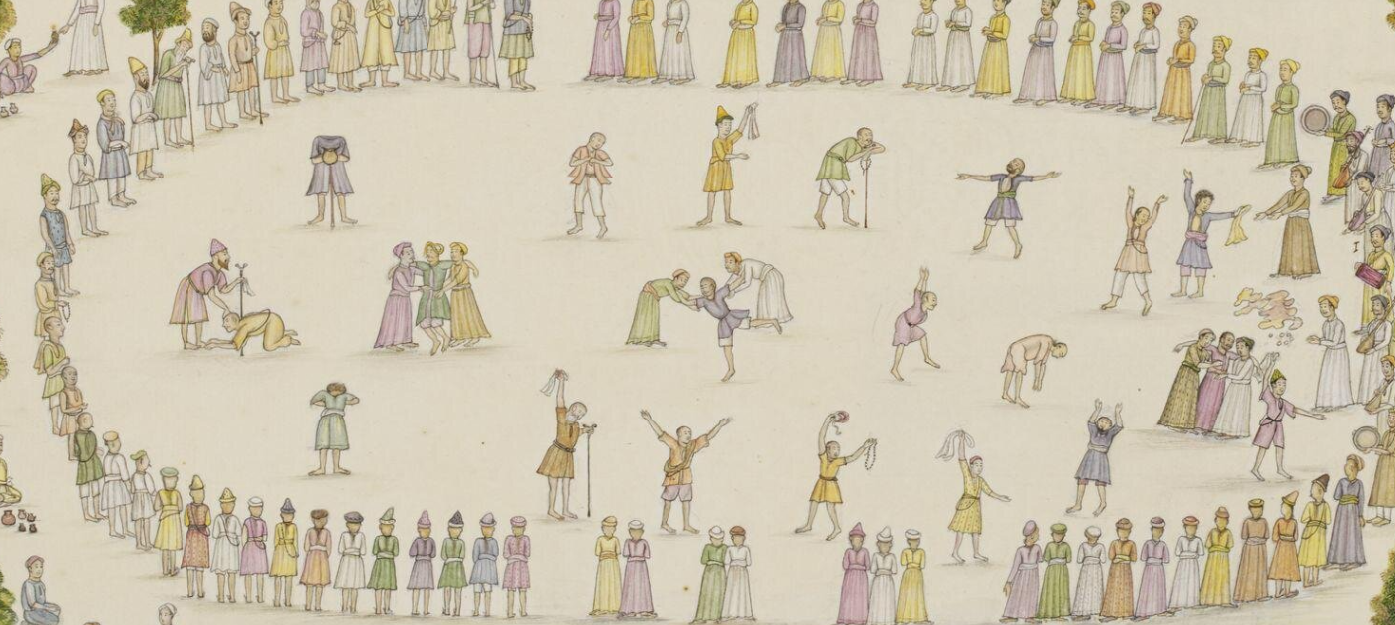
Assembly of fakirs in ecstasy, drunk with love of God

Roshan-ud-Daulah was known for the construction of the Sunehri Masjid in the Chandni Chowk in Dehli, which he built for the local Sufi Saint, Shah Bik, of whom he was a disciple. The Sunehri mosque is a place of interest as it was here that Nader Shah ordered a massacre in Delhi. As a governor of the region of Saharanpur, Roshan-ud-Daulah also donated the Ambehta to his Pir Shah Muhammad Baqir, a son of Shah Abdul Maali, whose descendants still retain their ancestral property. He celebrated Mawlid, the anniversary of the Prophet, "on a grand scale...everyday he sent abundant supplies of various preparations such as Pulao and Sheer Birunj(milk dressed in rice) during the entire period of the festivities." He spent vast sums during the Urs ceremony at the Dargah of the Chishti saint, Bakhtiyar Kaki, in Mehrauli of south Delhi. He provided elaborate lighting devices along the 15 km road that led to the Dargah from the imperial palace at Dehli.

The Emperor, his mother, and ladies of the Harem sat at the Lahori gate of the Fort, enjoyed the scene of illumination, and before midnight retired to their apartments. Once a week Roshan-ud-Daula held the Majlis-i-Sama to which he invited a large number of mystics, saints, 'Ulama and pious persons of the city. In a state of ecstasy he tore up his golden clothes and distributed the pieces among the singers, besides offering gold and silver coins to them. When the music was over, the gathering was entertained with sumptuous meals consisting of several dishes in gold and silver wares.

== Relatives ==
His brother, Fakhr-ud-Daulah was governor of Kashmir and Bihar, until he was sacked from his posts. He was reinstated as governor of Kashmir by Nader Shah.

Roshan-ud-Daulah was known to have several sons. Among them, Khan-i-Khanan Muhammad Kabir Khan was appointed Bakhshi of the Deccan by Salabat Jang, and Roshan-ud Dawlah Munawwar Ali Khan succeeded his uncle Fakhr-ud-Daulah as governor of Bihar.
