= Pincer movement =

Military tactic: simultaneously attacking both sides of an enemy formation

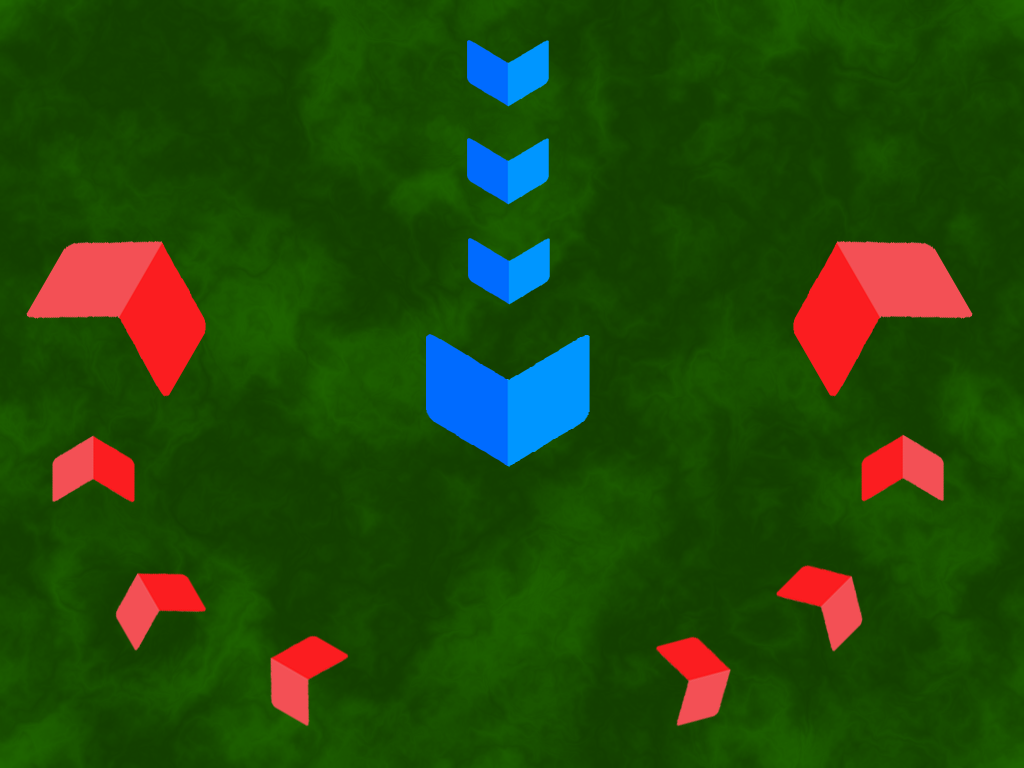
A pincer movement whereby the red force surrounds the advancing blue force

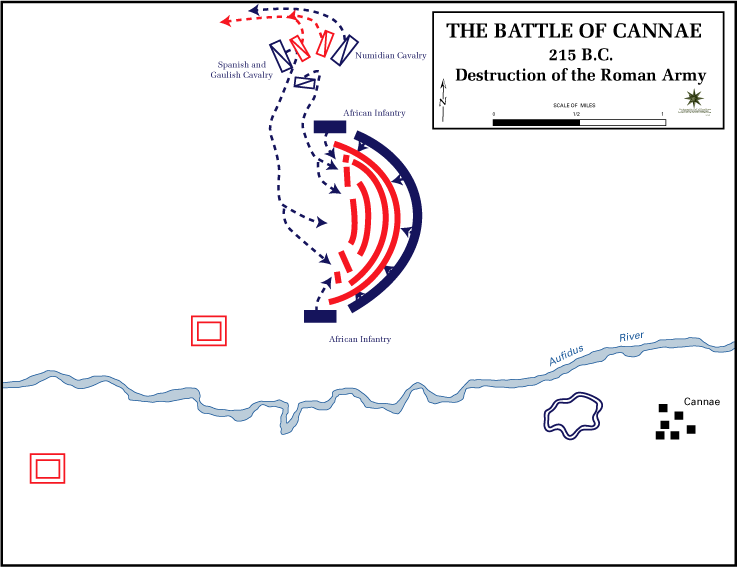
Destruction of the Roman army during the Battle of Cannae

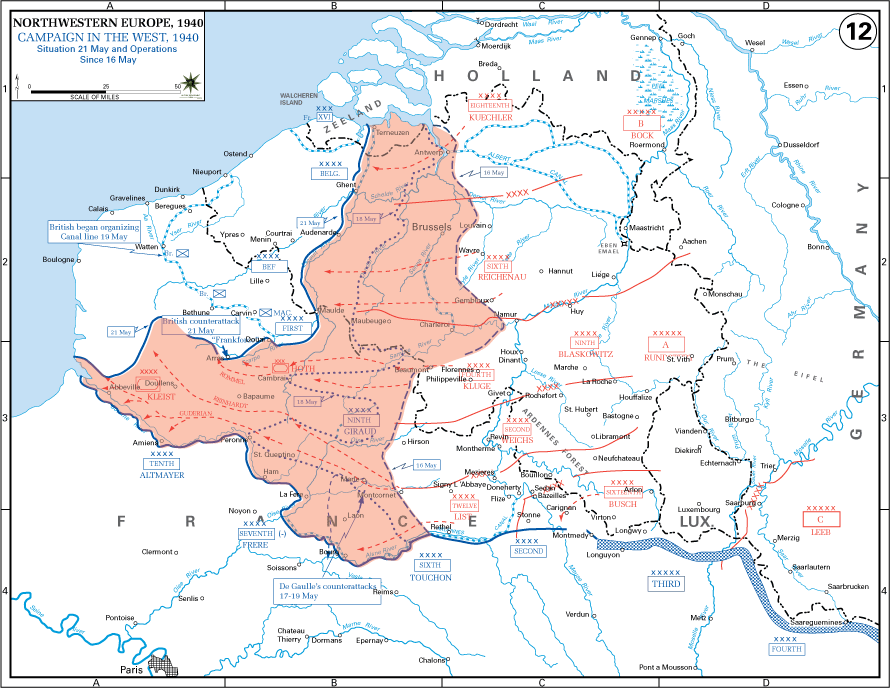
Envelopment of the Allied armies in Flanders during the Battle of France

The envelopment of the German Sixth Army during Operation Uranus

The pincer movement, or double envelopment, is a military maneuver in which forces simultaneously attack both flanks (sides) of an enemy formation. This classic maneuver has been important throughout history of warfare.

The pincer movement typically occurs when opposing forces advance towards the center of an army that responds by moving its outside forces to the enemy's flanks to surround it. At the same time, a second layer of pincers may attack the more distant flanks to keep reinforcements from the target units.

== Description ==
A full pincer movement leads to the attacking army facing the enemy in front, on both flanks, and in the rear. If attacking pincers link up in the enemy's rear, the enemy is encircled. Such battles often end in surrender or destruction of the enemy force, but the encircled force can try to break out. They can attack the encirclement from the inside to escape, or a friendly external force can attack from the outside to open an escape route.

== History ==
Sun Tzu, in The Art of War (traditionally dated to the 6th century BC), speculated on the maneuver but advised against trying it for fear that an army would likely run first before the move could be completed. He argued that it was best to allow the enemy a path to escape (or at least the appearance of one), as the target army would fight with more ferocity when surrounded. Still, it would lose formation and be more vulnerable to destruction if shown an avenue of escape.

The maneuver may have first been used at the Battle of Marathon in 490 BC. The historian Herodotus describes how the Athenian general Miltiades deployed 900 Plataean and 10,000 Athenian hoplites in a U-formation with the wings manned much more deeply than the center. His enemy outnumbered him heavily, and Miltiades chose to match the breadth of the Persian battle line by thinning out the center of his forces while reinforcing the wings. In the course of the battle, the weaker central formations retreated, allowing the wings to converge behind the Persian battle line and drive the more numerous but lightly armed Persians to retreat in panic.

The maneuver was used by Alexander the Great at the Battle of the Hydaspes in 326 BC. He launched his attack at the Indian left flank, and the Indian king Porus reacted by sending the cavalry on the right of his formation around in support. Alexander had positioned two cavalry units on the left of his formation, hidden from view, under the command of Coenus and Demitrius. The units were then able to follow Porus's cavalry around, trapping them in a classic pincer movement.

A famous example of its use was at the Battle of Cannae in 216 BC, when Hannibal executed the maneuver against the Romans. Military historians cite it as the first successful use of the pincer movement that was recorded in detail, by the Greek historian Polybius.

It was also later used by Khalid ibn al-Walid at the Battle of Walaja in 633, by Alp Arslan at the Battle of Manzikert in 1071 (under the name crescent tactic) and by Saladin at the Battle of Hattin in 1187.

Genghis Khan used a rudimentary form known colloquially as the horns tactic. Two enveloping flanks of horsemen surrounded the enemy, but they usually remained unjoined, leaving the enemy an escape route to the rear. It was key to many of Genghis's early victories over other Mongolian tribes.

It was used at the Battle of Mohács by Süleyman the Magnificent in 1526 and by Field Marshal Carl Gustav Rehnskiöld at the Battle of Fraustadt in 1706.

Even in the horse-and-musket era, the maneuver was used across many military cultures. A double envelopment was deployed by the Iranian conqueror Nader Shah at the Battle of Kirkuk (1733) against the Ottomans; the Turco-Persian army, under Nader, flanked the Ottomans on both ends of their line and encircled their centre despite being numerically at a disadvantage. In another battle at Kars in 1745, Nader routed the Ottoman army and subsequently encircled their encampment. The Ottoman army soon after collapsed under the pressure of the encirclement. Also during the Battle of Karnal in 1739, Nader drew out the Mughal army which outnumbered his own force by over six to one, and managed to encircle and defeat a significant contingent of the Mughals in an ambush around Kunjpura village.

Daniel Morgan used it at the Battle of Cowpens in 1781 in South Carolina. Zulu impis used a version of the maneuver that they called the buffalo horn formation.

The maneuver was used in the blitzkrieg of the armed forces of Nazi Germany during World War II, developing into a complex, multidisciplinary endeavor. It involved fast movement by mechanized armor, artillery barrages, air force bombardment, and effective radio communications, with the primary objective of destroying enemy command and control chains, undermining enemy troop morale and disrupting supply lines. During the Battle of Kiev (1941) the Axis forces managed to encircle the largest number of soldiers in the history of warfare. Well over half-a-million Soviet soldiers were taken prisoner by the end of the operation.

== See also ==
- Encirclement
- Flanking maneuver
- Two-front war
