= Morteza Mirza Afshar =

18th-century Afsharid prince

Nasrollah Mirza
- Prince of Iran
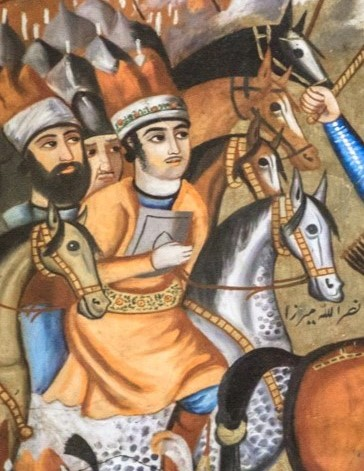
- Nasrollah Mirza (detail) as depicted in the painting in the Chehel Sotoun commemorating the Battle of Karnal
- Born: Morteza Mirza; 1724; Safavid Iran
- Died: July 1747 (aged 22–23); Kalat, Khorasan, Afsharid Iran
- Issue: Oldoz Khan; Timur Khan; Mustafa Khan; Sohrab Sultan; Morteza Qoli Khan; Asadollah Khan; Oghuz Khan; Oktay Khan; Nasrollah Mirza
- Dynasty: Afsharid
- Father: Nader Shah
- Mother: Gowhar Shad
- Religion: Shia Islam

Morteza Mirza Afshar (Persian: مرتضی‌میرزا افشار) was an Afsharid prince and the son of Nader Shah of Iran, who was renamed Nasrollah Mirza (نصرالله‌میرزا افشار) in honour of his role in the victory at Karnal. He proved to be a talented military leader and demonstrated his worth during the battle of Karnal by commanding the centre of the Iranian army which defeated Sa'adat Ali Khan's forces and captured his person.

He also held independent command during the Ottoman–Persian War of 1743-46 where he was tasked by Nader Shah of penetrating into Ottoman held Mosul province and engaging one of the two Ottoman armies whilst his father, Nader, marched against the other army at Kars in the north. He dealt a decisive blow to the Turkish and Kurdish forces around Mosul at the Battle of Mosul (1745).

== Early life ==
After the death of Nader Shah's first wife, who was the elder daughter of Baba Ali Beg, the governor of Abiward, he married Gowhar Shad, the younger daughter of Baba Ali in the early 1720s. Morteza Qoli (also known as Nasrollah Mirza) was born in 1723 or 1724 as a result of this union. Nasrollah had multiple wives, with one of them being the daughter of Shah Tahmasp II, and another Iffat-un-Nissa Begum, the daughter of Dawar Bakhsh.

== Death ==
In July 1747, Ali-Qoli Mirza (who later named himself "Adel Shah"), the nephew of Nader Shah, ascended to the Afsharid throne following a successful revolt against his uncle. In order to consolidate his power, he sent a force to the Kalat fortress with orders to kill all of Nader's issue, including Nasrollah Mirza. Adel Shah's men slaughtered sixteen descendants of Nader, which included three sons of Nader, five sons of Reza Qoli Mirza and eight sons of Nasrollah Mirza. There are a great deal of inconsistencies between the various accounts. Shahrokh Shah is incorrectly noted as included in the massacre according to Marvi. News of Shahrokh's murder circulated while he remained alive in captivity as well. Shabani lists Asadollah Khan as two months old, while Abd al-Hosayn lists him as 3 years old. Marvi lists 7 sons killed, while Barati lists 8. Reported death in this particular purge could be false or overinflated.

However, the other two sons of Nader, Nasrollah Mirza and Imam Qoli Mirza successfully escaped along with Nader's grandson Shahrokh, but they were soon captured near the city of Marv. Nasrollah Mirza and his brother were executed in Mashhad shortly after their capture in July 1747, while Shahrokh was spared. Shahrokh later reclaimed the Afsharid throne and ordered the execution of Adel Shah in 1748.

== See also ==
- Joseph von Semlin

== Sources ==
- Avery, P.; Hambly, G. R. G.; Melville, C. (1991). The Cambridge History of Iran. Vol. 7. Cambridge University Press. doi:10.1017/CHOL9780521200950. ISBN 9781139054997.
- Axworthy, Michael (2006). The Sword of Persia: Nader Shah, from Tribal Warrior to Conquering Tyrant (1st ed.). I.B. Tauris. ISBN 9780755612291.
