= Siege of Mosul (1743) =

Siege of the Persian invasion of the Ottoman Empire

- Part of the Ottoman–Persian War (1743–1746) and the Campaigns of Nader Shah
Date	13 September – 20 October 1743
Location	Mosul, Mosul Eyalet
Result	Inconclusive: Siege suspended; Negotiated Persian withdrawal

Belligerents
Persian Empire	Ottoman Empire; Mamluk Iraq

Commanders and leaders
Nader Shah	Ahmad Pasha; Hussain Pasha al-Jalili

Strength
40,000+: 390 cannon; 230 mortars	40,000+

Casualties and losses
Up to 5,000 killed	Heavy (including civilians)

The siege of Mosul was the siege of the city of Mosul in Ottoman Iraq by Nader Shah's army during the Persian invasion of the Ottoman Empire in 1743.

== Commencement of the siege ==
The Persian siege train had been much improved and augmented since Nader's earlier campaigns as a Safavid general and included hundreds of heavy cannon and mortars. Bridges were built above and below the city. Once they were in position, the Persian gunners bombarded Mosul for eight days, the mortars starting fires and doing terrible damage in the interior of the city. Inhabitants of the city composed of natives and refugees, Muslims, Christians and Yazidis all of them joined enthusiastically in defending the city. Which resulted in numerous casualties from Yazidis and the capture of their leader by Nadir Shah. Artillery fire eventually succeeded in damaging a tower and making a breach. But the defenders, inspired by their commander, worked frantically and succeeded in repairing the damage. Persians also started digging mines under the walls of the city but those operations led to little success. A further major assault was carried out, by thousands of soldiers, carrying 1,700 scaling-ladders. The assault failed and Nader lost over 5,000 men. Persians tried at this stage to open negotiations, but the Ottoman commander was defiant and the defenders did their best to make the interior of the city look as normal as possible to Nader’s messengers, so that when he asked them for their impressions of the state of the city and the will of its people to resist, the answers were disappointing. Nader asked the Ottoman side to present peace proposals, and they agreed. The Persians later complimented the defenders of Mosul on their bravery.

== Conclusion ==
Maslawi force raised, organized and led by Hussein Pasha al-Jalili defeated the invasion of the Persian army of Nadir Shah. The event has been labeled as one of the most important events in 18th Century Middle Eastern history, not only due to its status as the only retreat suffered by the great Persian conqueror at the hands of his Ottoman adversaries, but as a defeat inflicted not by an Ottoman imperial army commanded by an Ottoman general, but by provincial forces. The Persian army lifted the siege of Mosul, although the siege of Basra in the south continued nonetheless. Hussein Pasha al-Jalili's success in repelling Nadir Shah’s forces in 1743 helped lead to the end of the Shah's initiative to conquer Iraq. The peace treaty was negotiated and signed by both parties. However, Mahmud I, Sultan of the Ottoman Empire, later reneged on the terms of agreement and resumed hostilities. Consequently, Nader besieged Kars and shortly thereafter destroyed the Ottoman army at the Battle of Kars in 1745.

== Sources ==
- Al-Tikriti, Nabil (2007). "Ottoman Iraq". The Journal of the Historical Society. VII (2): 201–212. doi:10.1111/j.1540-5923.2007.00214.x.
