= Ottoman–Persian War (1743–1746) =

War between the Ottoman Empire and the Afsharid Iran (1743–1746)

Ottoman–Persian War of 1743–1746
- Part of the Ottoman–Persian Wars and the Campaigns of Nader Shah
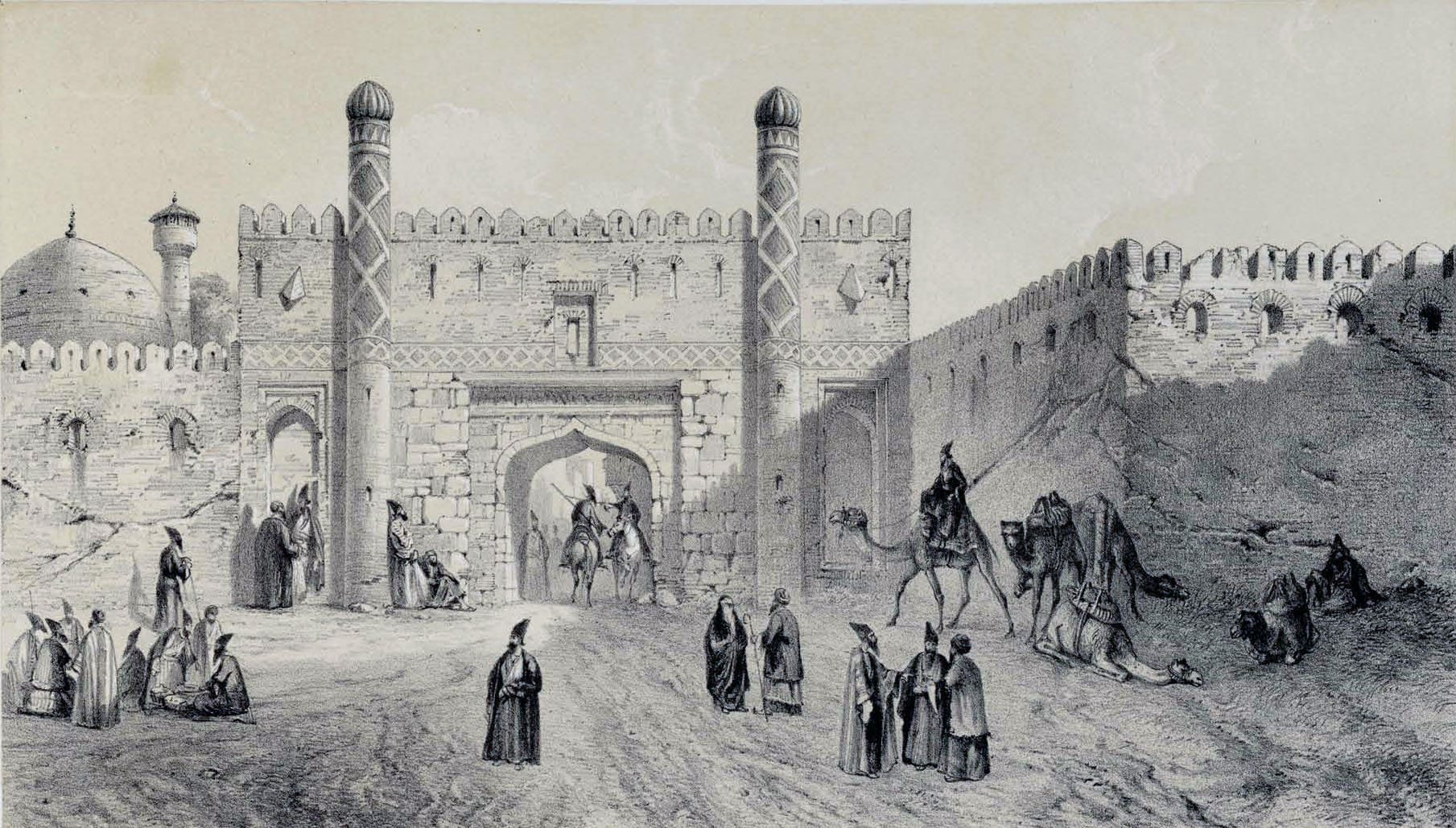
- Gates of Tabriz
Date	1743–1746
Location	Iraq, Armenia, Georgia, Iran and Eastern Anatolia
Result	Treaty of Kerden
Territorial changes	Status quo ante bellum

Belligerents
Afsharid Iran	Ottoman Empire

Commanders and leaders
Nader Shah; Nassrollah Mirza; Tahmasp Khan Jalayer; Ahmad Khan Abdali	Mahmud I Field commanders: Mehmed Yegen Pasha †; Abdullah Pasha Jebhechi

Strength
375,000+	Unknown

Casualties and losses
Unknown	Unknown

The Ottoman–Persian War of 1743–1746 or Ottoman–Iranian War of 1743–1746 was fought between the Ottoman Empire and Afsharid Iran.

== Background ==
Persia attempted to ratify the Treaty of Constantinople, by demanding that the Ja'fari, also known as the Imamiyyah, was to be accepted as a fifth legal sect of Islam.

In 1743, Nader Shah declared war on the Ottoman Empire. He demanded the surrender of Baghdad. The Persians had captured Baghdad in 1623 and Mosul in 1624, but the Ottomans had recaptured Mosul in 1625 and Baghdad in 1638. The Treaty of Zuhab in 1639 between the Ottoman Empire and the Safavid Empire had resulted in peace for 85 years. During the fall of the Safavid dynasty, Russia and the Ottoman Empire agreed to divide the northwest and the Caspian region of Persia, but with the advent of Nader Shah, the Russians and the Turks withdrew from the region. Nader Shah waged war against the Ottomans from 1730 to 1736, but it ended with a stalemate. Nader Shah afterwards turned east and declared war on the Mughal Empire and invaded India, in order to refund his wars against the Ottomans.

== The war ==
Nader Shah dreamt of an empire which would stretch from the Indus to the Bosphorus. Therefore, he raised an army of 200,000, which consisted largely of rebellious Central Asian tribesmen, and he planned to march towards Constantinople, but after he learnt that the Ottoman ulema was preparing for a holy war against Persia, he turned eastwards. With a force of over 300,000, he captured Kirkuk, Erbil and besieged Mosul on 14 September 1743. During his siege of Mosul he killed many Yazidis and captured their leader. The siege lasted for 40 days. The Pasha of Mosul, Hajji Hossein Al Jalili, successfully defended Mosul and Nader Shah was forced to retreat. The offensive was halted due to revolts in Persia (1743–1744) over high taxes. Hostilities also spilled into Georgia, where Prince Givi Amilakhvari (1689–1754) employed an Ottoman force in a futile attempt to undermine the Persian influence and dislodge Nader's Georgian allies, Teimuraz II and Erekle.

In July 1744, Nader Shah resumed his offensive and unsuccessfully besieged Kars, but was forced to return to Dagestan to suppress a revolt. He returned afterwards and routed an Ottoman army at the battle of Kars in August 1745. The war disintegrated. Nader Shah grew insane and started to punish his own subjects, which led to a revolt from early 1745 to June 1746. In 1746, peace was made. The boundaries were unchanged and Baghdad remained in Ottoman hands. Nader Shah dropped his demand for Ja'fari recognition. The Porte was pleased and dispatched an ambassador but before he could arrive, Nader Shah was assassinated by his own officers.

== See also ==
- Nader Shah
- Ottoman–Persian Wars
