= Joseph von Semlin =

- Prince of Persia
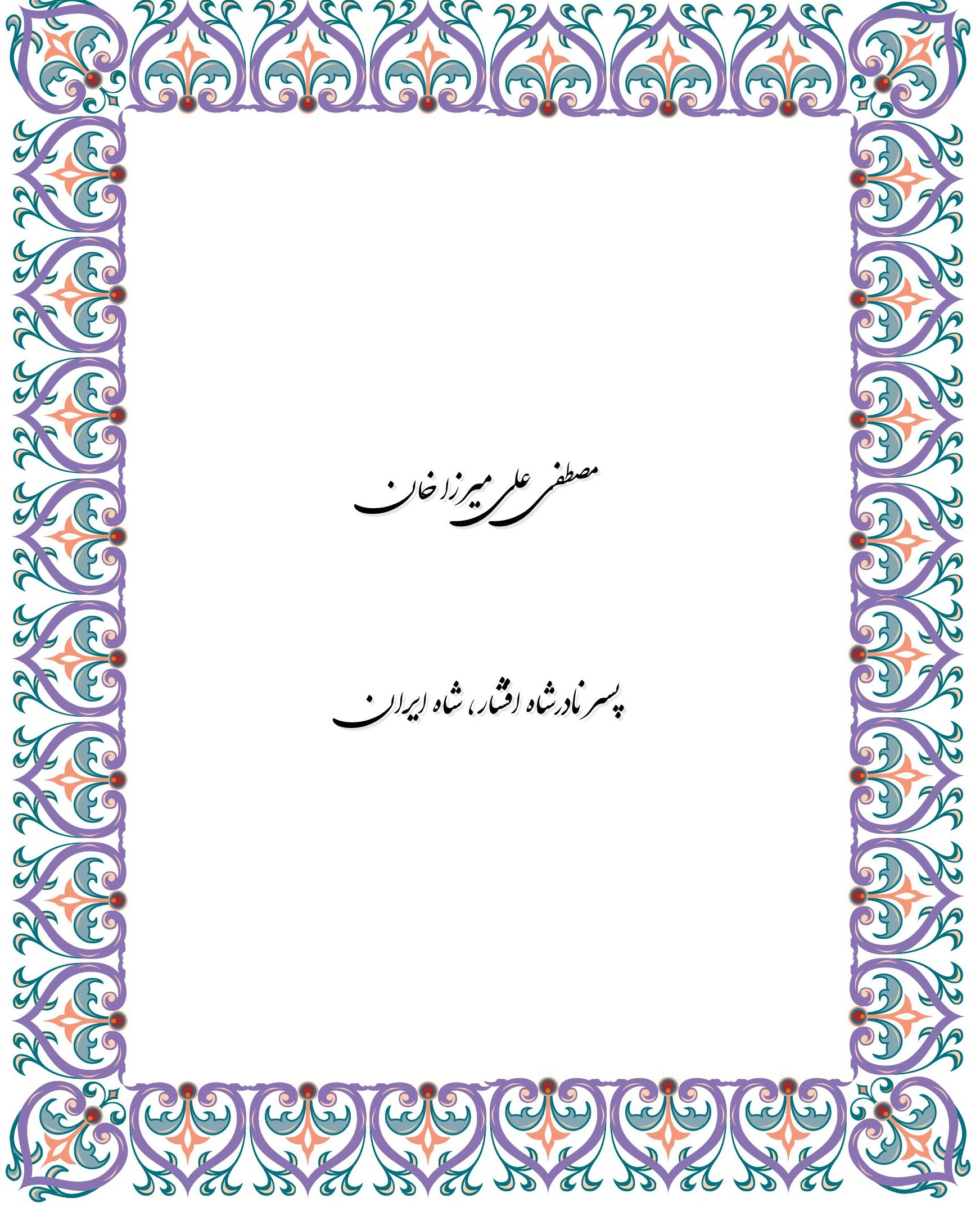
- Persian Nastaliq written name of Mostafa Ali Mirza Khan son of Nader Shah, king of Iran
- Born: Mostafa Ali Mirza Khan; 1736; Isfahan, Persia
- Died: 1824 (aged 87–88); Mödling, Austria
- Spouse: Roza von Semlin
- Issue: Johann; Joseph
Names
- Johann Joseph von Semlin
- Dynasty: Afsharid
- Father: Nader Shah
- Religion: Christian but previously Shiite
- Occupation: Freiherr
- Military career
- Allegiance: Holy Roman Empire; Russian Empire
- Service years: 1756–1792
- Rank: Major
- Conflicts: Seven Years' War; Third Silesian War; Battle of Breslau (1757); Battle of Hochkirch

Johann Joseph von Semlin (born Mostafa Ali Mirza Khan, Persian: مصطفی علی میرزا خان; 1736–1824) was the reputed son of Nader Shah. After his father's murder, a loyalist brought Ali Mirza Khan to Maria Theresa in Vienna, then Austrian Empire, who named him "Johann Joseph Freiherr von Semlin". In 1746, when Von Semlin was 10 years old, he was sent to Graz to learn the German language and European culture. In 1756, he converted to Christianity and two years later returned to Vienna.

== Early life ==
Von Semlin was born in 1736 in Isfahan, Persia.

In 1746, at age 10, he moved to Graz and began learning German.

== Military service ==
On completing his education at a Viennese military school, Von Semlin joined the Austrian army, rising after a few years to the rank of Commander. Von Semlin entered the service of the Austrian Empire and fought in the Seven Years' War as a Major. At the end of the war, he received a Medal of Honor.

Captured in war in Prussia, he was known as the Prince of Persia among his troops. Frederick the Great invited him to his palace and returned him to Maria Theresa.

With two injuries received during his military service, Von Semlin retired in 1792 on a monthly pension of 810 florins.

== Retirement ==
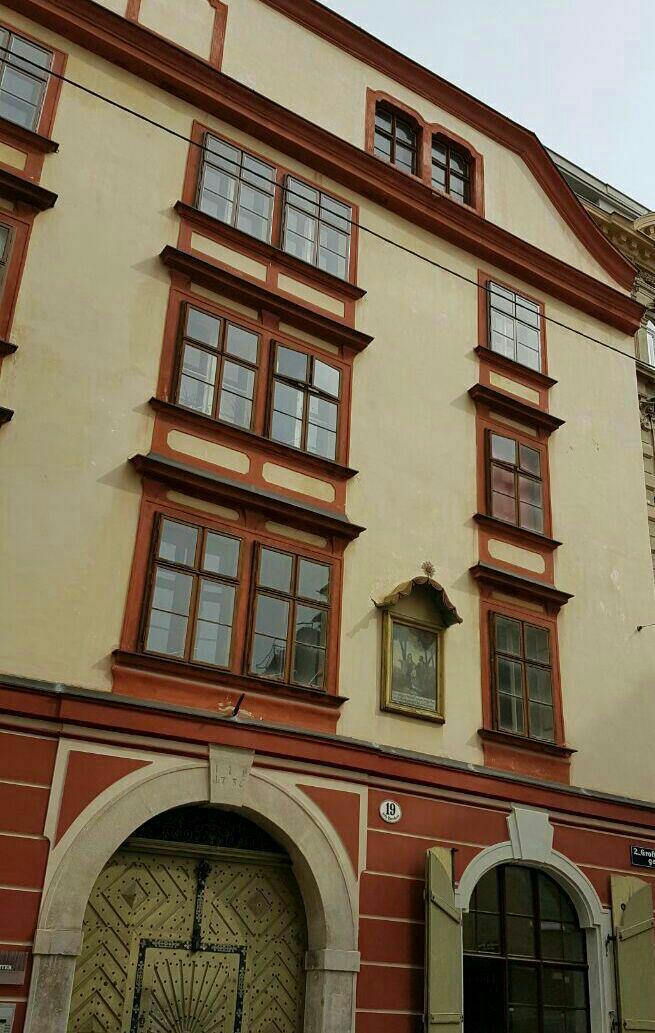
Von Semlin's house in District 2 of Vienna

Upon his retirement from the military, Von Semlin caught the attention of the French government. An ambassador of Napoleon requested Von Semlin to attempt to take the throne of Iran, offering him military support. Von Semlin rejected the offer, saying "Neither me nor my children think about the Peacock Throne. Even if I have any rights to become king of Iran, I cede them to Francis II, Holy Roman Emperor, who supported me to this age."

== Death ==
Von Semlin died in Mödling, near Vienna, and was buried in his home garden. In line with his will and testament, 5 gulden was paid to each poor person who attended his funeral. He signed bills using his Persian name, Ali Mirza Khan, up to his death.

== Personal life ==
Von Semlin had two sons, Johann and Joseph. After attaining the legal age, they both joined the Austrian army.

== See also ==
- Afsharid dynasty
