= Treaty of Kerden =

Treaty between the Ottoman Empire and Afsharid Iran

Treaty of Kerden (Turkish: Kerden Antlaşması, Persian: عهدنامه گردان) was signed between the Ottoman Empire and Afsharid Iran on 4 September 1746. It concluded the Ottoman–Persian War (1743–1746).

== Background ==
During the last years of the Safavid dynasty in Iran, the Ottomans were able to annex most of the Caucasus and western Iran, due to hereditary strife, civil unrest and total chaos. Meanwhile, the Afghans were able to annex parts of Khorasan. The shah had to appoint Nader, an Iranian Afshar Turkoman warlord, as his commander in chief.

Under Nader's commandship, Iran was able to regain most of its losses. After the victories, Nader was able to seize the throne and, in 1736, establish the Afsharid dynasty, which would last until 1796. Nader Shah was planning to found another great Persian empire, stretching from the Indus to the Bosphorus, as in the ancient times.

After reconquering former territories of Iran, he further tried to annex the eastern territories of the Ottoman Empire (eastern Anatolia and Iraq). He also proposed to reconcile the two major sects of Islam (the Ottoman dynasty was of Sunni faith and most Iranians were of Twelver Shia faith). He planned to force the Ottoman Empire, the most powerful Sunni state, to accept Twelver Shia Islam as a fifth legal school of jurisprudence of Sunni Islam.

== The terms of the treaty ==
The treaty was signed in Kerden (a location near Qazvin, Iran). The representatives were Hasan Ali Haji (Afsharid side) and Mustafa Nazif (Ottoman side).

1. The boundary line between the two countries was the same boundary line drawn roughly a century earlier according to the Treaty of Zuhab of 1639 (i.e., which included roughly the demarcation of the modern Iran–Turkey and Iran–Iraq border lines).
2. The Ottomans agreed to stop opposing the Afsharid dynasty as the rulers of Iran.
3. The Ottomans also agreed to allow the Iranian hajis (pilgrims) to Mecca (then under Ottoman control).
4. Exchange of consulates (Turkish: şehbender) were permitted in both countries.
5. Iran abandoned to force the Ottomans to convert to Shia Islam.
6. Both sides agreed to liberate prisoners of war.

== Sources ==
- Fisher; et al. (1991). The Cambridge History of Iran: From Nadir Shah to the Islamic Republic. Vol. 7. Cambridge: Cambridge University Press. p. 309. ISBN 978-0521200950. "Both sides now saw that neither could win a decisive victory, and that continuation of the war would only drain their strength. Nadir Shah hoped to use his victory at Baghavard to secure a favourable settlement, finally abandoning his claims on behalf of the Ja'fari sect, and instead concentrating on the demand that all of Iraq, including Baghdad, Basra and the Shi'i holy places of Najaf and Karbala, be turned over to him along with the Kurdish area of Van. A series of letters and exchanges of ambassadors followed, and eventually an agreement was hammered out on 4 September 1746, by which the Qasr-i-Shirin treaty boundaries were restored without change, with provisions made for the exchange of prisoners, as well as the exchange of ambassadors once every three years. Nadir Shah thereby abandoned all his former demands and the Ottomans accepted peace in accordance with the earlier agreements."
