= Siege of Kars (1744) =

Siege during the Ottoman–Persian War of 1743–1746

- Part of the Ottoman–Persian War (1743–1746) and the Campaigns of Nader Shah
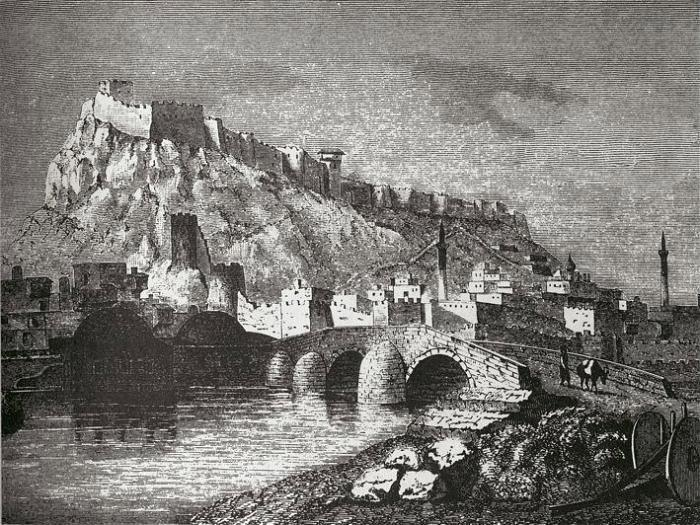
| Date | 29 July – 9 October 1744 |
| Location | Kars, Caucasus |
| Result | Ottoman victory |

Belligerents
| Ottoman Empire | Persian Empire |

Commanders and leaders
| Nişancı Ahmed Pasha | Nader Shah |

The siege of Kars took place in 1744 during the Ottoman–Persian War of 1743–1746. Nader Shah, ruler of Persia, laid siege to the city of Kars on 29 July 1744. The siege was unsuccessful and the Persians retreated on 9 October.

== Prelude ==
After suffering a major defeat at the siege of Mosul in 1743, the Persian army under the command of Nader Shah agreed to an armistice, negotiated by the governor of Mosul, Abdülcelilzade. This included a prisoner exchange with Hüseyin Pasha. Later, while serving as governor of Baghdad Province, Abdülcelilzade returned control of Kirkuk and Erbil to the Ottoman Empire, which Nader Shah had previously occupied with the consent of Ahmed Pasha. Finally, the siege of Basra was lifted.

During the winter of 1743-1744, Nader Shah faced a number of rebellions, some of which were supported by the Ottomans. In December 1743, Nader successfully suppressed Lezgin attacks from Dagestan, although he encountered internal struggles, such as the Shiraz uprising led by Persian Beylerbeyi Taki Khan and Qajar uprisings in Esterabad. The Ottoman Empire completed its military preparations against Iran with the help of Baghdad Governor Ahmed Pasha’s diversionary tactics against Nader Shah, who managed to suppress them until the Nowruz festival. Additionally, Kars Serasker Nişancı Ahmed Pasha and East Anatolian Serasker Aleppo Governor Kazıkçı Hüseyin Paşa were appointed, alongside Baghdad's Governor Ahmed Pasha.

The commander of the Kars garrison, Nişancı Ahmed Pasha, received orders to assist Iranian prince Safi Mirza, who was vying for the throne. Nader Shah’s primary objective was to neutralize this threat by capturing and blinding Safi Mirza before sending him to Kars. Nader Shah then launched an attack on Kars.

== Siege ==
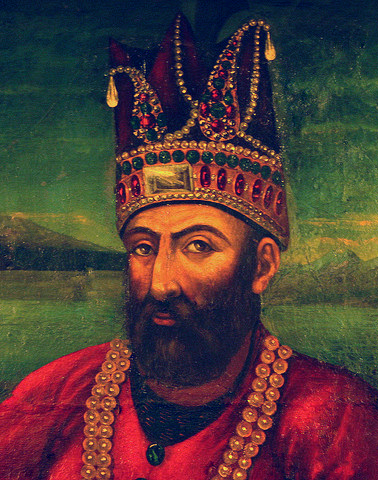
Posthumous portrait of Nader Shah, 1774

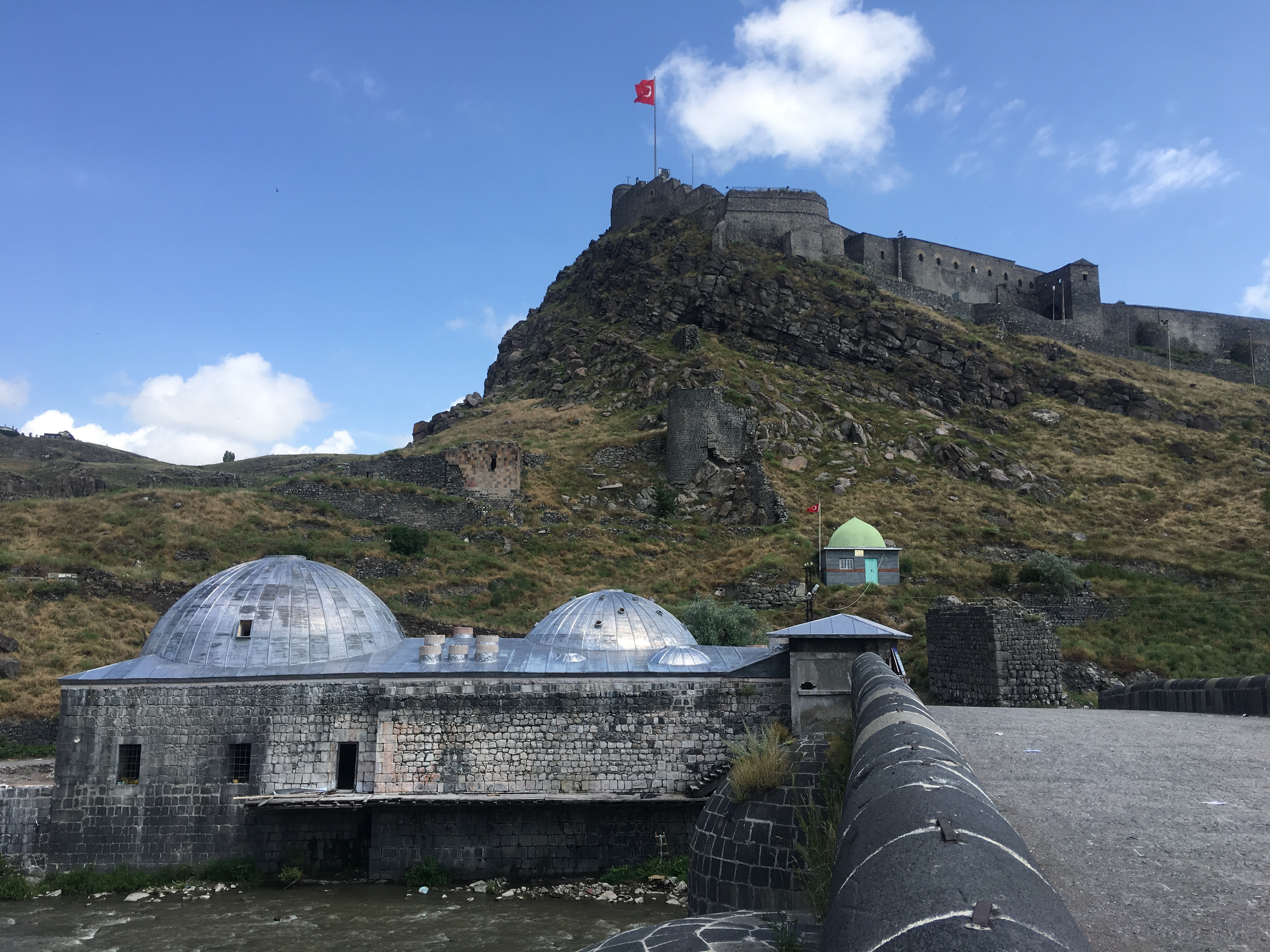
Kars Castle today

The Iranian army, under the command of Nader Shah, arrived in Kars on 29 July 1744, after crossing the Arpaçay via Tabriz-Nakhchivan. Upon arrival, Nader established his headquarters on a hill south of the city and ordered trenches to be dug around the fortress of Kars. He then sent a letter to the garrison commander, Nişancı Ahmed Pasha, offering surrender, stating that artillery was unnecessary and that cutting off the water supply would be sufficient to capture the castle.

Ahmed Pasha did not respond to the offer. The Persian army took defensive measures, enlarging the lake with water from the Kars River, digging a wide and deep ditch around the perimeter, constructing two-metre-long trenches with cannons, and fortifying the trenches with additional cannons to create a line of defence.

Despite the preparations, the Ottoman garrison's chain of command showed weakness, following the Serasker's orders. A group of disobedient Ottoman soldiers attempted to leave the castle and attack the Iranian army. To organise the situation, Ahmed sent Veli Pasha as commander, but the Ottoman troops failed in their mission and retreated to the castle.

Nader Shah aimed to strengthen the siege by connecting Kars and Erzurum. He moved his headquarters to Kümbet, a village on the Kars-Erzurum road, to block any Ottoman movement and began his attacks. Despite ten military offensives over the course of a month, the Iranian army failed to maintain its position due to heavy losses. The Ottomans, aware of the Persians' shortcomings in siege warfare, exploited their weaknesses. The most significant attack occurred on 25 August, but the Iranians could not breach the castle’s defences. In total, 1,700 Iranian soldiers, two Pashas, and 80 Ottoman soldiers died.

Nader Shah then placed camel-loads of cotton from Revan between tree stakes to block the Kars Stream and cut off the castle's water supply. However, the attempt failed on 2 September when rain caused the Kars Stream to return to its original course.

After these failed tactics, Nader Shah invited the Ottoman ambassador, Defterdar Kesriyeli Ahmet Efendi, to his headquarters and made new peace offers, but they were again rejected.

On 13 September 1744, Nader Shah intensified the siege. Ottoman forces inside the castle were positioned as follows: Tırhala Beylerbeyi Murteza Pasha at the Behrampaşa Gate in Ankara, the Janissaries of Nevşehir under command in Gözcütepe, and Trabzon Governor Selim Pasha with the soldiers from the Niğde and Kütahya Banners. In the bastion near the mosque, Erzurum Governor Veli Pasha and Mustafa Pasha were stationed on the right wing, while soldiers from Izmit held the western bastion under the command of Levent. Nişancı Ahmed Pasha was also stationed there, with the camp sergeant leading artillery troops on the hill. Soldiers from Alâiye, Karahisar, and Icel banners defended the hill slopes, with Bayrakdar Ahmed Pasha in charge of the Timurpasa Bastion.

From his headquarters in Kümbet, Nader Shah besieged the castle with trenches and towers. On 18 September, he fired artillery at the Timurpasa Bastion, planning a general offensive for the following day. However, the Ottoman garrison retreated before dawn, surrounding the Iranian army and launching a counterattack (Huruç Operation), which forced the Iranians to flee on 19 September, abandoning nine field guns.

For three weeks, the Iranian army occupied a valley near the castle and bombarded it with 16 large cannons. Despite their efforts, the fortress remained intact. Casualties increased due to harsh weather, and on 9 October 1744, after 73 days of an unsuccessful siege, Nader Shah ordered a retreat.
