= Siege of Mashhad (1730) =

Unsuccessful siege against Safavid Iran

- Part of Herat campaign of 1730–1732
Date	1730
Location	Mashhad, Khorasan, Safavid Iran
Result	Safavid victory

Belligerents
Safavid Iran; Afghan loyalists	Sadozai Sultanate of Herat

Commanders and leaders
Nader; Ebrahim Khan Afshar	Zulfaqar Khan Abdali

Strength
Unknown	8,000

The Siege of Mashhad (Persian: محاصره مشهد) was an unsuccessful siege led by Zulfaqar Khan Abdali against Safavid Iran in 1730.

== Background ==
In January, Zulfaqar Khan revolted from Farah. After a 3-month conflict, he entered Herat on 21 April 1730 and Allahyar Khan fled the city. He was given refuge by Nader's brother, Ebrahim Khan Afshar.

== Siege ==
In July 1730 and following the fall of Herat, Zulfaqar Khan, believing that Nader would be defeated or killed in the war with the Ottomans, attacked Mashhad with 8,000 soldiers. Roughly two weeks into the confrontation, and in defiance of Nader's direct orders to remain in the citadel, Ebrahim Khan attacked Zulfaqar Khan's army. Zulfaqar Khan defeated the Iranian army, forcing it to withdraw into the city walls which now came under siege.

When news of Zulfaqar Khan's invasion reached Nader, he left Tabriz on 16 August and marched his forces to Khorasan. He gave his soldiers little rest during the long route from Tabriz to Mashhad as if the city were to fall and Ebrahim Khan killed, the conflict with Zulfaqar Khan would become more difficult. A month into the siege, Zulfaqar Khan acquired a lot of gunpowder. Therefore, he ordered his soldiers put fuses into holes on the citadel's walls, light them with gunpowder and blow them up. When Nader entered the city, he heard an explosion and so ordered an attack on Zulfaqar Khan's army. Zulfaqar Khan was defeated in the battle with Nader and retreated to Herat.

== Aftermath ==
After Zulfaqar Khan retreated to Herat, Nader besieged and conquered it.

== See also ==
- Military of Afsharid Iran
- Herat campaign of 1729
- Battle of Herat (1729)

== Sources ==
- Nejatie, Sajjad (2017). The Pearl of Pearls: The Abdālī-Durrānī Confederacy and Its Transformation under Aḥmad Shāh, Durr-i Durrān (PhD thesis). University of Toronto.
- University of Calcutta (1885) Calcutta Review p 425
- E.J. Brill Brill's First Encyclopaedia of Islam p 810
- Engheta, Nasser (1992). Nader—restless hero, failed king (in Persian).
