= Reza Qoli Mirza Afshar =

Iranian prince (1719–1747)

Reza Qoli Mirza
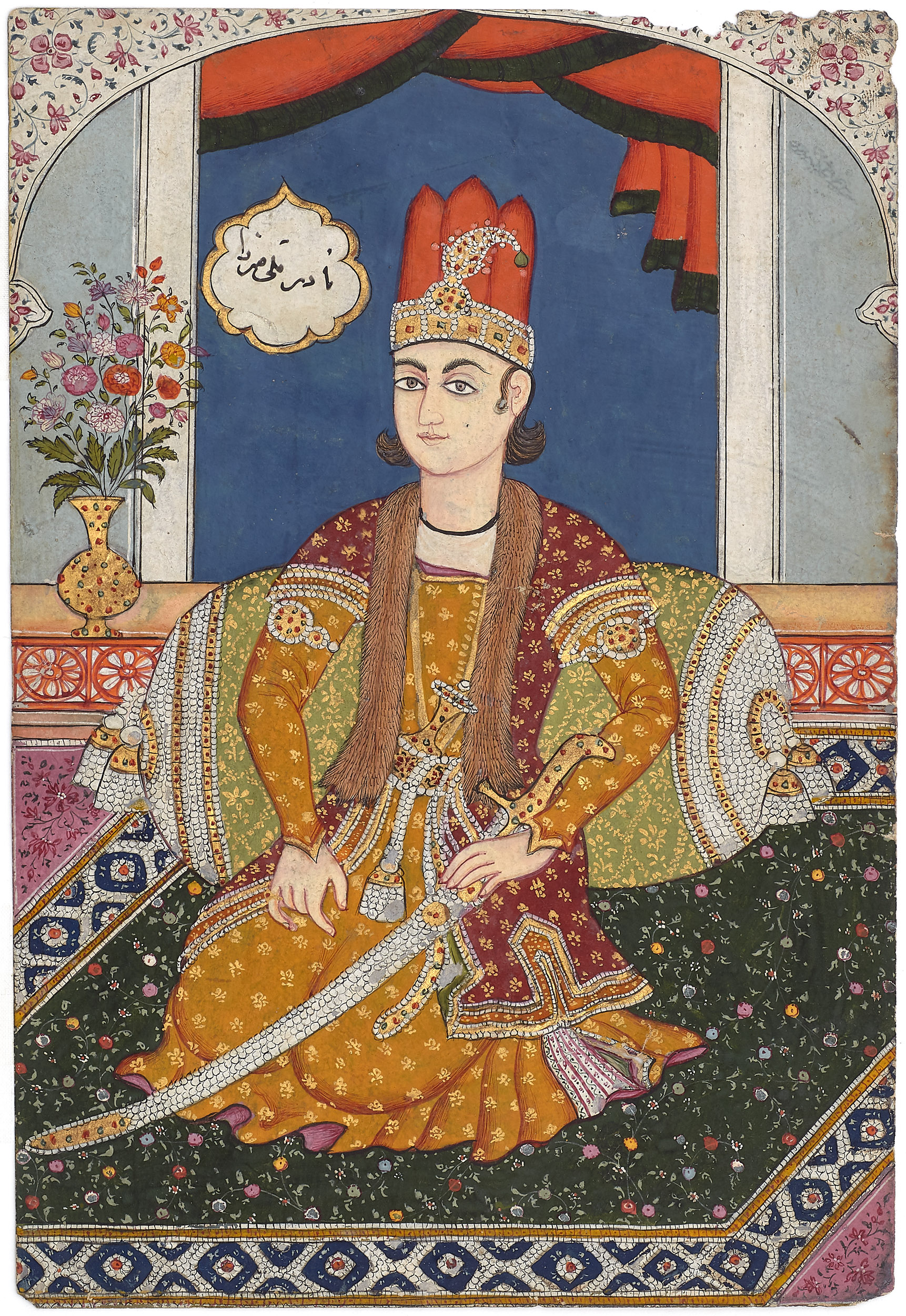
- Indian portrait of Reza Qoli Mirza Afshar, dated 1800–1820
- Born: 1719; Abivard, Safavid Iran
- Died: 1747 (aged 27–28); Kalat, Afsharid Iran
- Spouse: Fatemeh Begum
- Issue: Shahrokh Shah
- Dynasty: Afsharid
- Father: Nader Shah
- Religion: Shia Islam

Reza Qoli Mirza Afshar (Persian: رضا قلی میرزا افشار; 1719–1747) was the eldest son of Nader Shah of Afsharid Iran. After his father's coronation in 1736, Reza Qoli, aged 17, became the Governor of the province of Khorasan. During his tenure, he subdued rebellious khans and marched up to Bukhara to put an end to the Khanate of Bukhara, his father's enemies. Before heading off to India, Nader Shah appointed Reza Qoli the regent of Iran. Reza Qoli ensured peace through harsh measures when collecting taxes and executed people for petty crimes. He had Tahmasp II and Abbas III, two pretenders to the throne, killed, which caused an uproar among the people. When Nader Shah returned from India, he dismissed Reza Qoli as regent, snubbing him for his actions during the regency.

Afterwards, Reza Qoli served as a commander in his father's army, but the relationship between the two had turned to bitterness. Reza Qoli, constantly humiliated by Nader, criticised his father, and Nader grew more distrusting of his son. Although he later regretted it, Nader blinded Reza Qoli after suspecting him to be behind an assassination attempt in 1742. Reza Qoli was confided in Kalat fortress until 1747, when he was executed by his cousin and the claimant to the throne, Adel Shah.

During his life, Reza Qoli received a positive appraisal from his contemporaries. He was described as a just ruler, even if he had committed cruelties. His blinding left a great impact on his father and the realm. Nader Shah underwent a mental breakdown and became a bitter and nihilistic man, and faced many rebellions all across the kingdom because of his tyranny. Modern historians speculate that Reza Qoli could have been an able monarch for Iran, based on his abilities in commerce and war.

== Life ==
=== Early life ===
Reza Qoli Mirza was born in 1719 in Abivard (now on the borders of modern-day Turkmenistan and Iran). His mother was the daughter of Baba Ali Beg Kuse Ahmadlu, the governor of Abivard and an important tribal leader among the Afshars of Khorasan, a large region on the east of Iran. (Note: Afshars were tribes of Turkic origin who had been settled in Khorasan since the reign of Abbas the Great, the Shah of Safavid Empire (r. 1567–1629).) His father was Nader Qoli Beg Afshar, the future Shah of Iran (r. 1736–1747). The infant was named Reza Qoli, honouring the name tradition among the Afshar people, with Qoli meaning servant, and Reza referring to the eighth Shi'ia Imam, Ali al-Rida. Reza's mother died five years after his birth, Nader married her younger sister, Gowhar Shad, with whom he had two sons.

In 1722, Mahmud Hotak (r. 1722–1725) and his Afghan army invaded Iran and ended the Safavid dynasty. Amid the power vacuum left by Safavid's collapse, Nader conquered Mashhad, south of Abivard, and relocated his court, including Reza Qoli, to there in 1726. Impressed by Nader's victory at Mashhad, Tahmasp II, the Safavid pretender (r. 1729–1732), appointed him as his commander-in-chief. Nader led the Safavid armies through numerous victories, eventually defeating the Hotak army in Battle of Zarghan. As a reward for his endeavours, Nader became the governor of several provinces. Moreover, to cement their alliance, Nader and his son, Reza Qoli, both were to marry one of Tahmasp's sisters. Nader married Razia Begum, and the young Reza Qoli was betrothed to Fatemeh Begum.

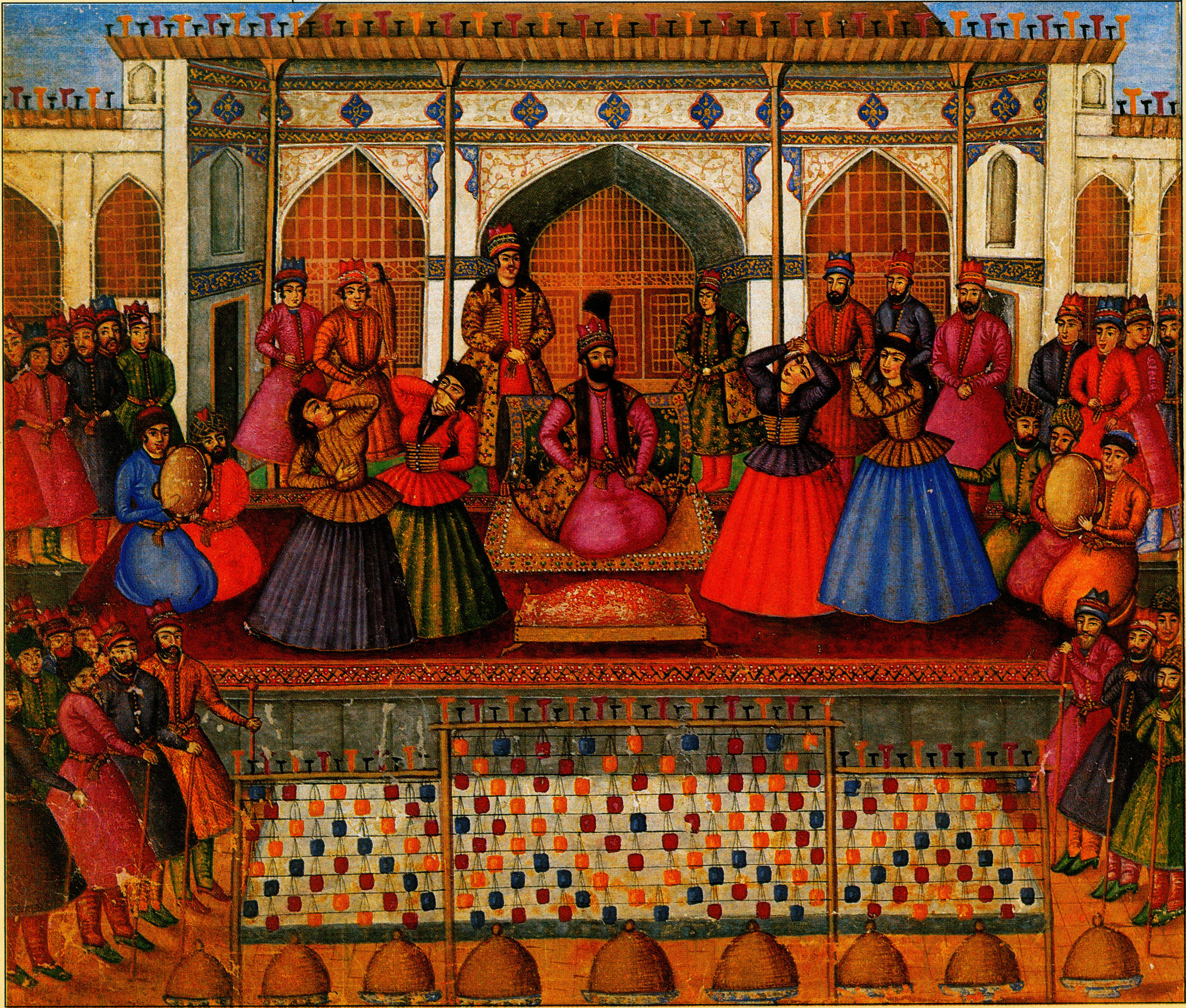
Wedding of Reza Qoli Mirza, folio from Jahangosha-ye Naderi by Mirza Mehdi Khan Astarabadi, 1757.

When Reza Qoli was twelve years old, the Abdali Afghans revolted and besieged Mashhad while Nader was in Anatolia, campaigning against the Ottomans. Reza's uncle, Ebrahim Khan, failed to subdue the rebels. When Reza Qoli informed Nader of the situation through a letter, Nader requested Reza to hold on within the city as he was on his way to the east. The Abdalis withdrew from Mashhad and went back eastwards to Herat immediately after learning that Nader was returning to the region. Thus, the city was saved. Nader was proud of Reza Qoli's intelligent response to the Abdali attack, recognising his son's talent.

In January 1731, Reza Qoli married Fatemeh Begum in Mashhad. Nader made the effort to reach the city in time to attend the wedding. The grand wedding celebrations, lasting for a week, were held in Chaharbagh gardens, outside of Mashhad. At the end of the celebrations, an auspicious planetary conjunction was observed in the sky. Then the attendance went to a hunting expedition around Abivard and welcomed Nowruz (Iranian new year) a few weeks later. Nader set out to Herat on March 1731 to completely quell the Abdalis and returned victorious in February 1732. On March 1734, concurrent with Nowruz, Fatemeh Begum gave birth to a son, whom Nader named Shahrokh, after Shah Rukh son of Timur, thus displaying his interest to emulate a conqueror on the scale of Timur.

=== Governor of Khorasan ===
Due to his inabilities, Tahmasp II was deposed in favour of his infant son, Abbas III (r. 1732–1736). However, Nader's prestige and renown allowed him to bid for the throne, so he summoned the great leaders across the realm to gather in Mughan Plain and give consent for his ascension. On the day of his coronation, 8 March 1736, Nader Shah appointed Reza Qoli Mirza as the Governor of Khorasan and appointed Tahmasp Khan Jalayer as his son's mentor and regent. Nader thus put an end to the Safavid tradition of imprisoning the crown princes in the harem by giving Reza Qoli an army to command and a region to rule over. Furthermore, Nader bestowed upon Reza Qoli the duty of preservation and protection of the northern borders and the maintenance of Khorasan's security.

In early 1737, Reza Qoli and Jalayer amassed an army to suppress the rebellion of Ali Mardan Khan Afshar, one of the fellow tribesman of Nader, who ruled the cities of Andkhoy and Balkh (both in modern-day Afghanistan). Reza Qoli quickly subjugated Chichaktu (today in Qaysar District), marched through Maymana and camped outside of Andkhoy. With Ali Mardan Khan unwilling to yield, Reza Qoli besieged the city, and bribed the Qarai and Salur tribes to stage a mutiny against Ali Mardan. After six weeks of resistance, Ali Mardan surrendered. He met with Reza Qoli in-person, offering him a substantial amount of jewelries. Ali Mardan Khan was chained and suspiciously died en route to the prison in Herat. Reza Qoli continued his campaign by successfully seizing Sheberghan and Aqcha (in northern Afghanistan) and later besieging Balkh in July 1737. The Ming ataliq of Balkh, Sayid Khan, dug deep trenches and stationed the Balkh army behind them. However, Reza Qoli's artillery overcame the defense, and the Afshar army defeated Sayid Khan. Reza Qoli thus brought an end to long rule of the descendants of Gengiz Khan in Balkh. Pleased with the news of Reza Qoli's success, Nader Shah offered many valuable gifts to his son, among them were high-bred horses, three hundred robes of honour and gold.

Afterwards, Reza Qoli, supported wholeheartedly by Jalayer, crossed the Amu Darya and advanced into the lands of the Khanate of Bukhara, ignoring Nader's direct orders barring them from it. With 8500 of his men, Reza Qoli laid siege on Qarshi, an important town (in modern-day Uzbekistan). The Khan of Bukhara, Abu al-Fayz Khan (r. 1711–1747), called for the help of Ilbars Khan, ruler of Khiva. Ilbars Khan marched into Transoxiana region, yet, in fear of a confrontation with the Afshar army, fled away. Abu al-Fayz set out with a large army to relieve Qarshi. Initially, Abu al-Fayz pushed Reza Qoli back, but through the use of their artillery, the Afshar army obliterated his cavalry. Abu al-Fayz and the remaining of his men retreated into the castle. Reza Qoli, overjoyed with his victory, conquered a nearby fort and killed many of its inhabitants. Afterwards Nader ordered Reza Qoli to refrain from continuing his campaign. He sent a letter to Abu al-Fayz Khan, recognising him as the sovereign of Bukhara. Reza Qoli and Jalayer returned southwards but did not end their campaign, instead they marched into Kunduz and the mountainous Badakhshan in the east. Nader summoned them to join him in Jalalabad and they went there quickly, via Kabul.

=== Regent of Iran ===
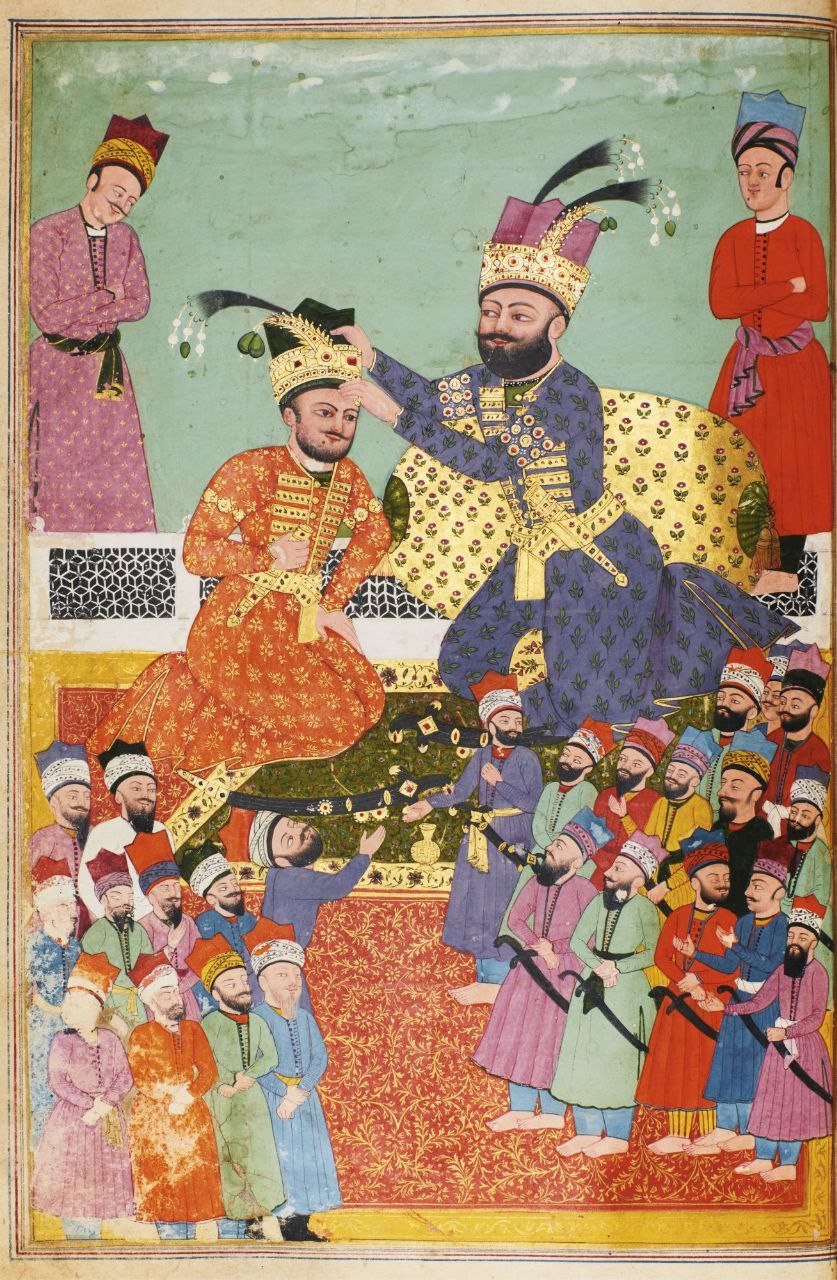
Nader Shah appoints his son Reza Qoli Mirza as Prince Regent before leaving for India, folio from Jahangosh-ye Naderi, made in North India, dated 1757-1758

Upon their arrival at Jalalabad, Nader snubbed Jalayer, but seeing his apparent remorse, he decided to forgive him. Nader reviewed his son's troops, provided them with new armours and Arab horses and appointed Reza Qoli as the Regent of Iran while he was absent, campaigning in India. Nader gave Reza Qoli strict orders. Reza Qoli was to consult the advisors his father had chosen for him, and was not allowed to dismiss or change them. Moreover, Reza Qoli was responsible for Tahmasp II and Abbas III, both of whom were imprisoned in Sabzevar. Reza Qoli left Jalalabad on 17 November and returned to Balkh, while Nader marched eastwards towards India.

In 1738, the news of a Turkoman horde led by Ilbars Khan of Khiva reached Reza Qoli, who along with his cousin, Ali Qoli Khan, stationed their army in Abivard. Whilst Reza Qoli and his men were vigilant, Ilbars Khan's men were divided by envy and rivalry, and the disagreements among his army forced the Khan of Khiva to withdraw from his invasion after raiding some areas south of Abivard. With the threat quelled, Reza Qoli and Ali Qoli Khan returned to Mashhad.

Reza Qoli dedicated the first three months of his rule in Mashhad to forming a special corps of 12000 jazayerchi (musketeer) soldiers. He arranged these soldiers to be equipped with armours made out of gold and weapons inlaid with gold and silver. Moreover, against Nader's initial orders, he began interfering in the politics of various states within the realm and dismissing his advisors to replace them with those of his own choosing.

At the time, the economic toll of Nader's army on the citizens was heavy as agents used any method to collect taxes to make up for the army's great monetary needs. Reza Qoli's personal army thus contributed to this problem; in a letter written by his cousin, Ali Qoli Khan, he was forewarned that the presence of his standing army would bring Mashhad to a state of bankruptcy. To remedy this problem, in 1739, Reza Qoli granted a trading charter to the representatives of the Muscovy Company, Captain John Elton and Mungo Graeme. Furthermore, Reza Qoli dispatched his agents, who were renowned for their cruelty, across the realm to tax the locals. According to the Dutch report, Reza Qoli too was quite cruel, and would execute people for meager crimes. Although he was also described as a just ruler, for example, he had prevented Mohammad Taqi Khan, governor of Shiraz, from continuing his oppression upon the people of the city.

Reza Qoli held monopoly over the Silk trade; he distributed silk into the market and barred any trader from buying silk through any other source than himself. (Note: Although as noted by Michael Axworthy this was a traditional royal prerogative and not far-fetched for someone of Reza Qoli's rank to do.) Accordingly, Reza Qoli Reza Qoli acquired great wealth among his peers; in a letter to his father, he claimed to possess 150 million tomans. When Nader asked him how he was able to gather so much money, he answered that he "has turned into a merchant and now deals in the trades".

By early 1739, no word of Nader had reached Reza Qoli's court in ten months and there was a rumour spreading about Nader's death in India. While Reza Qoli must have been more well-informed than the general populace about the whereabouts of his father, a breakdown in communication in spring 1739 may have left Nader's position in ambiguity. Nonetheless, Reza Qoli readied himself to be crowned king, ordering a new seal, new coinage and a new coat of arms. An assembly was to be gathered again in the Mughan Plain for Reza Qoli's coronation.

Around these times, Reza Qoli was visited by Mohammad Hossein Khan Qajar, the custodian of Tahmasp II and Abbas III, who reported of a probable pro-Safavid rebellion fueled by the rumours of Nader's death. He proposed to kill Tahmasp and Abbas; he had the support of many of the courtiers who claimed Nader wouldn't mind if Tahmasp and Abbas were dead. Reza Qoli eventually gave in to the persuasion and ordered the death of Tahmasp and Abbas. Mohammad Hossein took it upon himself to carry the orders; he first strangled Tahmasp and then killed the nine-year old Abbas with a blow of his sword. When the people of Sabzavar heard the news, they began an uprising against Mohammad Hossein and Reza Qoli, likening the death of Tahmasp and his son to the Battle of Karbala and the culprits to Shimr and Yazid I (r. 680–683). Meanwhile, Nader had decisively defeated the Mughal army in the Battle of Karnal. The news of his victory reached Reza Qoli's court in June 1739, who reportedly, had become crestfallen for the deaths of Tahmasp and Abbas.

Reza Qoli held a banquet in honour of his father's victory, during which, his wife, Fatemeh Begum, who was a sister of Tahmasp, learnt of his family's death from her old wet nurse. Overwhelmed by the news, she fainted and, once recovered, started to cry aloud. She refused Reza Qoli's presence and angrily demanded him to begone. She committed suicide that night by hanging herself with a silken string. The news of her death greatly affected Reza Qoli, who deeply loved his wife.

=== Removal and blinding ===
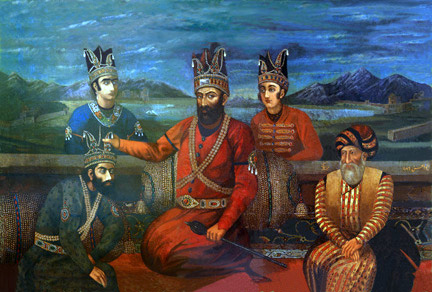
The Investiture of the Crown Prince Reza Qoli Mirza, by his Father, Nader Shah Afshar, by Abu'l-Hasan Mostawfi Ghaffari, 1774, now kept at Sa'dabad Complex at Tehran. Two other of Nader's sons, and a mullah (religious authority who used to crown previous kings), are also present in the painting.

Once Reza Qoli heard that Nader and his army were returning to Iran, he set out with his special army to greet them midway. On 25 June 1740, he reached Nader's camp at north of Herat. Nader, while mounting an Indian elephant, greeted Reza Qoli and welcomed him into his camp, then he, still on his elephant, reviewed his son's army and ostensibly praised them, though in truth, he felt apprehensive about the glamour of these soldiers, because he himself disliked magnificence. Therefore, he disbanded his army and handed the soldiers to his own commanders. Then he criticised Reza Qoli's actions during his tenure and condemned him for killing Tahmasp and his son. Per this reason, he dismissed Reza Qoli as regent and appointed his younger son, Morteza Mirza, who renamed himself Nassrollah Mirza, (Note: Morteza Qoli changed his name to Nassrollah Mirza (Persian: نصرالله میرزا افشار, romanized: Naṣr-Allāh, lit. 'Victory of Allah'), because during the war with the Mughal empire, he had triumphantly led an army into Qandahar and captured the city.) as his regent in Mashhad.

Reza Qoli accompanied Nader in his campaign in Transoxiana, acting as the army's supply officer. During this short campaign, Nader finally succeeded in subduing Abu al-Fayz Khan of Bukhara. To ratify his vassalage, Abu al-Fayz offered two of his daughters to marry into Nader's family. The elder daughter, Manijeh, was to marry Reza Qoli, and the younger daughter was to marry Ali Qoli Khan, Nader's nephew. But Reza Qoli refused to marry Manijeh; one account claims that he was more besotted with the younger daughter and was envious of Ali Qoli Khan, while the other claims that he was not ready to remarry after Fatemeh Begum's death. At the end, Reza Qoli married neither of the daughters, Nader took Manijeh to wife, and Ali Qoli, per arranged, married the younger daughter.

On March 1741, Nader commenced a campaign to Dagestan to avenge his brother, Ebrahim Khan, who had been killed by Lezgins dwelling there. Nader took Reza Qoli with him, appointing him as one of his commanders. By this time, Reza Qoli, on several instances humiliated by Nader, openly criticised his father for his passion for conquest and war, his words would reach Nader's ears by the reports of bystanders. On 15 May, Nader survived an assassination attempt by an unknown assailant in the forests of Mazandaran. He began mass interrogation of the people in his camp, but was preconceived that Reza Qoli had a hand in the assassination. In Summer 1742, Nader's agents brought him a man called Nik Ghadam, who had admitted that he was the assassin and that Reza Qoli Mirza was his employer. When Nader confronted Reza Qoli with the accusation, his son drew a dagger in anger, so Nader had him arrested. Several high ranking officials tried to convince Reza Qoli to admit to his crime and apologise but Reza Qoli would not be convinced. At last, Nader ordered his son to be blinded but soon became regretful after his gouged out eyes were presented to him. (Note: According to a contemporary chronicle, Nader, overwhelmed by sorrow, wailed and cried over his son's eyes.) Three days after the blinding, he visited Reza Qoli, who only said to him: "You should know that by taking my eyes out, you have blinded yourself and destroyed your own life."

=== Later life and death ===
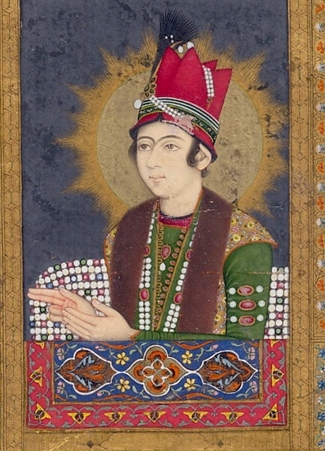
Ali Qoli Mirza who was crowned king under the name Adel Shah, Nader's successor and Reza Qoli's cousin

After Reza Qoli's wounds were healed, Nader sent him to be confided in the Kalat fortress, in the Khorasan region. He lived through the rest of his father's reign in isolation and loneliness, his company being a few of his servants and some of his young nephews. When Nader Shah died in 1747, his nephew, Ali-Qoli Mirza, claimed the throne and named himself Adel Shah (r. 1747–1748). In order to secure his inheritance, Adel Shah sought the death of Nader's sons and grandsons, including Reza Qoli Mirza, his brothers and their offspring. By his orders, Sohrab Khan Gholam laid siege on Kalat and after sixteen days, conquered the fortress. Reza Qoli, blinded and depressed by the time, was executed in 1747.

== Legacy ==
Reza Qoli was survived by his eldest son, Shahrokh Shah Afshar, who in 1748 replaced both Adel Shah and Ebrahim Afshar (r. 1748–1749), and became the ruler of Khorasan. Reza Qoli never remarried after Fatemeh Begum, who may have also given birth to three more children, although it is uncertain.

Both contemporary and modern historians agree that Reza Qoli's blinding was the catalyst to Nader Shah's decline in rulership and character. It gave him a catastrophic mental breakdown which set him on a path to bitterness, nihilism and anger, eventually likening him to a madman. But it also caused numerous rebellions all across the country in opposition to him and his tyrannous rule. Contemporary historians all regard Reza Qoli's character and abilities with positivity, therefore, per speculation, he could have become a worthy ruler for his people, combining his father's military with his own knowledge of commerce and finance to build a more constructive administration. In later generations, Reza Qoli's words to Nader was romanticised to 'It is not my eyes that you have put out, but those of Persia,' referring to disasters and chaos that followed Nader's downfall.

== Bibliography ==
- Arunova, Marianna Rubenovna; Ashrafian, K.Z. (1958). Государство Надир-Шаха Афшара; очерки общественных отношений в Иране 30-40-х годов XVIII века [State of Nadir Shah Afshar; essays on social relations in Iran in the 30s and 40s of the 18th century] (in Russian). Moscow: Publishing House of Oriental Literature. OCLC 4069955.
- Avery, Peter (2008). "Nadir Shah And The Afsharid Legacy". In Avery, P.; Hambly, G. R. G; Melville, C. (eds.). The Cambridge History of Iran. Vol. 7. Cambridge: Cambridge University Press. ISBN 978-052120095-0. Archived from the original on 13 January 2023.
- Axworthy, Michael (2006). The Sword of Persia: Nader Shah, from Tribal Warrior to Conquering Tyrant. I.B.Tauris. ISBN 978-1850437062.
- Axworthy, Michael (2018). Crisis, Collapse, Militarism and Civil War: The History and Historiography of 18th Century Iran. Oxford University Press. ISBN 9780190250324.
- Axworthy, Michael (2007). "The Army of Nader Shah". Iranian Studies. 40 (5). Cambridge University Press: 635–646. doi:10.1080/00210860701667720. S2CID 159949082.
- Bregel, Yuri (2004). "Ilbārs Khan". In Yarshater, Ehsan (ed.). Encyclopædia Iranica (Online ed.). Encyclopædia Iranica Foundation.
- Floor, Willem (2023). "The Postal System in Safavid, Afsharid, and Zand Iran". Iranian Studies. 56 (4). Cambridge University Press: 721–747. doi:10.1017/irn.2023.51. S2CID 263026502.
- Floor, Willem (2009). The Rise and Fall of Nader Shah: Dutch East India Company Reports, 1730-1747. Mage Publishers. ISBN 9781933823324.
- Inqiṭāʻ, Nāṣir (2005). نادر، قهرمان بى آرام، پادشاه ناکام [Nader, the Relentless Hero, the Fruitless King] (in Persian). Los Angeles: Shirkat-i Kitāb. ISBN 9781883819033. OCLC 743079827.
- Perry, John. R. (1983). "ʿĀdel Shah Afšār". In Yarshater, Ehsan (ed.). Encyclopædia Iranica. Vol. I/5: Adat–Afghanistan. London and New York: Routledge & Kegan Paul. p. 452. ISBN 978-0-71009-094-2.
- Roemer, H. R. (2008). "The Safavid Period". The Cambridge History of Iran, Volume 6: The Timurid and Safavid Periods. Cambridge: Cambridge University Press. pp. 189–350. ISBN 9781139054980.
- Shabani, Reza (Autumn 1977). "فاجعه کور کردن رضاقلی میرزا بدست نادرشاه" [Blinding of Reza Qoli Mirza by Nader Shah, a tragedy]. Vahid. 175 (217): 34–43.
- Stöber, Georg (2010). "Afshār". In Fleet, Kate; Krämer, Gudrun; Matringe, Denis; Nawas, John; Rowson, Everett (eds.). Encyclopaedia of Islam (3rd ed.). Brill Online. ISSN 1873-9830.
- Savory, R.M. (1982). "ʿAbbās III". In Yarshater, Ehsan (ed.). Encyclopædia Iranica (Online ed.). Encyclopædia Iranica Foundation.
- Lee, Jonathan (1996). The "ancient Supremacy": Bukhara, Afghanistan, and the Battle for Balkh, 1731-1901. Islamic History and Civilization. Brill Publishers. ISBN 9789004103993. OCLC 911650940.
- Lockhart, Laurence (1938). Nadir Shah, A Critical Study Based Mainly Upon Contemporary Sources. London: Luzac. OCLC 580906461.
- Tucker, Ernest (2006). "Nāder Shah". In Yarshater, Ehsan (ed.). Encyclopædia Iranica (Online ed.). Encyclopædia Iranica Foundation.
- Zamani, Mohammad (2017). "Reza Qoli Mirza". Encyclopaedia of the World of Islam (in Persian). Tehran. OCLC 1049714918.

Reza Qoli Mirza Afshar Qereḵlū tribe Cadet branch of the Afshar tribe Born: 15 April 1719 Died: 20 June 1747
Political offices
Preceded by Ebrahim Khan	Governor of Khorasan	Succeeded by ?
Regnal titles
Vacant Title last held by Tahmasp Qoli Khan	Regent of Iran	Succeeded by Nassrollah Mirza
