= Battle of Kafir Qala (1719) =

Safavid-Sadozai battle in Afghanistan

- Part of the Abdali–Safavid conflicts
Date	19 May 1719
Location	Kafir Qala, Sadozai Sultanate of Herat (present-day Islam Qala, Afghanistan)
Result	Sadozai victory

Belligerents
Sadozai Sultanate of Herat	Safavid Iran

Commanders and leaders
Mohammad Zaman Khan; Asadullah Khan	Safi Quli Khan †

Strength
15,000	30,000-35,000

Casualties and losses
3,000 killed	10,000 killed

The Battle of Kafir Qala, also known as the Battle of Islam Qala, was fought on the 19th of May 1719 between the Sadozai Afghans of the Sadozai Sultanate of Herat, led by Mohammad Zaman Khan, and a Safavid Persian army led by Safi Quli Khan. The battle took place near the modern-day Afghan–Iranian border post of Islam Qala and resulted in a decisive victory for the Sadozais. The engagement marked the consolidation of Abdali independence from the Safavids and the foundation of the short-lived Sadozai Sultanate of Herat.

== Background ==
After being denied a share of the spoils from the conquest of Kandahar by Mirwais Hotak, Abdullah Khan sought to establish his own dominion in Herat. His initial attempt to stir revolt among the Abdalis of the Hari Rud was discovered, and both he and his son Asadullah Khan were imprisoned by the Persian governor. A mutiny among the Qizilbash garrison, however, enabled their escape to Obe, from where Asadullah overran the Hari Rud valley and occupied Murichaq on the Marghab River.

In the summer of 1717, Abdullah Khan captured Herat and struck coins in the name of Sultan Hayat Khan, the senior surviving member of the Khudakka clan. As Hayat Khan was elderly, he nominated Abdullah Khan as ruler of the newly established Sadozai Sultanate of Herat. In late 1717, by which time Mohammad Zaman Khan had been proclaimed leader in Herat, Safi Quli Khan Turkistan-Ughli, the military commander of Khorasan, led several successful campaigns against bands of Uzbek raiders in Khorasan. After subduing the Uzbeks, Safi Quli Khan made his way to Mashhad with the intention of launching an invasion of Herat. Safi Quli Khan gathered a large army at Mashhad and set out for Herat. Two years later, the Safavid government resolved to suppress this new Afghan polity and dispatched a major army against it. On the way to Herat in 1719, Safi Quli Khan defeated a force of 12,000 Uzbeks with his own force of 30,000

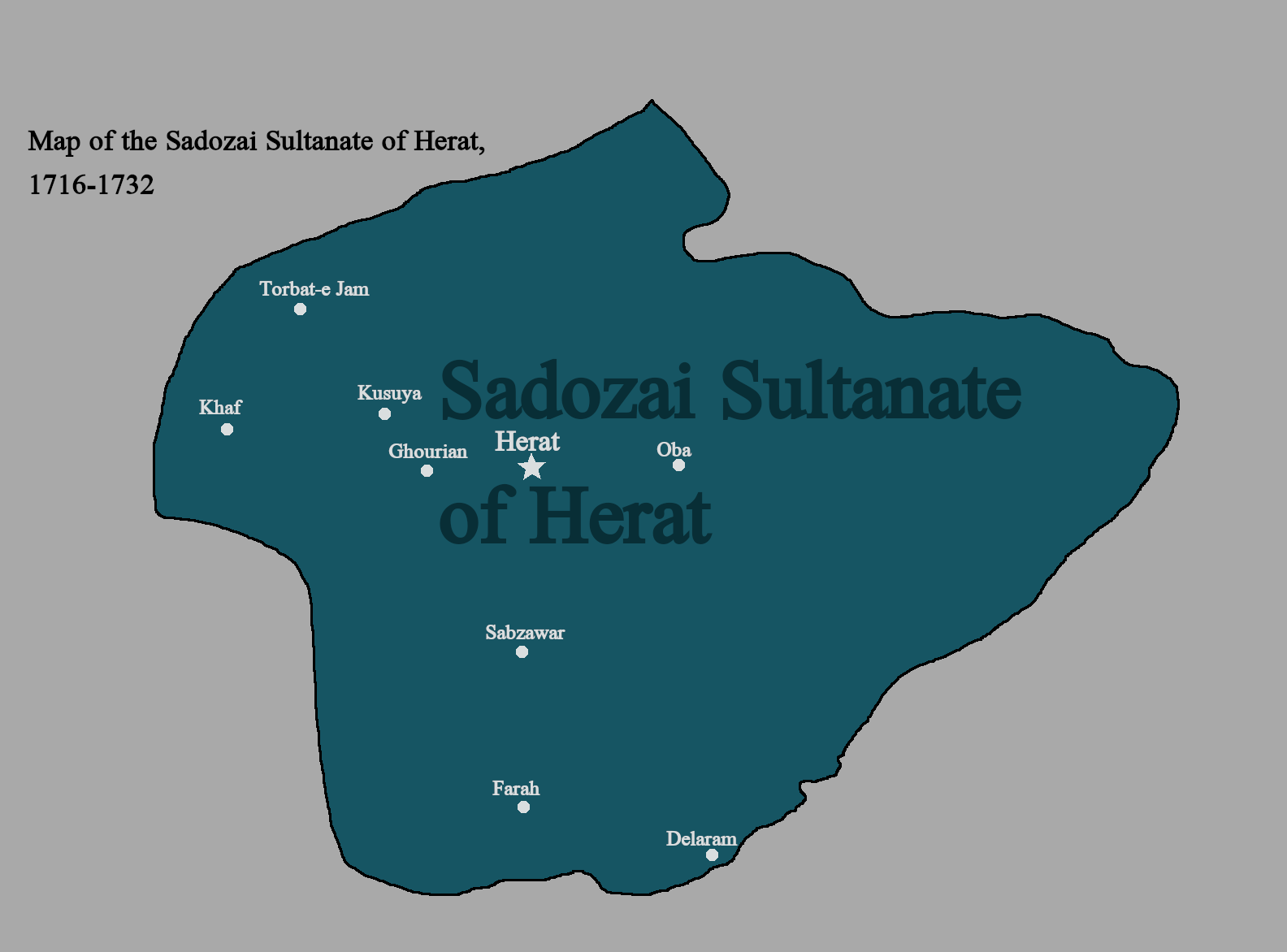
Map of the Sadozai Sultanate of Herat

== Battle ==
On the 19th of May 1719, a Persian force numbering about 30,000–35,000 men including an artillery train commanded by European officers advanced on Herat under Safi Quli Khan. Mohammad Zaman Khan, commanding roughly 15,000 Afghan fighters, chose to make his stand at Kafir Qala, a fortified outpost west of Herat near the frontier with Persia. Foreseeing the Persians' reliance on artillery, Asadullah placed his men behind orchard trees and in irrigation ditches to neutralize enemy fire. When the Persians commenced their bombardment, the Afghan positions held firm. As the Persian infantry advanced, they were met by concentrated flanking fire.

After several hours of heavy fighting, a Persian gunner accidentally ignited a powder magazine, and the ensuing explosion engulfed the artillery park in smoke. In the confusion, Persian gunners began firing upon their own troops. Sensing the disarray, Mohammad Zaman Khan ordered a full cavalry charge. The Afghan horsemen swept through the shattered Persian lines, routing the enemy. Safi Quli Khan was slain, and according to contemporary accounts, the Persian general, realizing the battle was lost, mounted a barrel of gunpowder and blew himself up rather than be captured.

== Aftermath ==
The Persians suffered 10,000 casualties, and their baggage train captured. Afghan casualties were reported at around 3,000 men one-fifth of Asadullah's force. The victory secured the Abdalis' independence and established their control over Herat and the western marches of Khorasan. Following the triumph, Asadullah urged his father to march east toward Mashhad, but Sultan ‘Abd Allah Khan instead chose to attack Kandahar and punish the Hotak dynasty for earlier treachery. The disagreement between the father and son would soon lead to further campaigns and the fateful Battle of Dilaram the following year.
