= Shahrokh Shah =

Afsharid shah of Iran (In Western Khorasan (1748–1796))

Shahrokh Shah شاهرخ‌شاه
- Shah
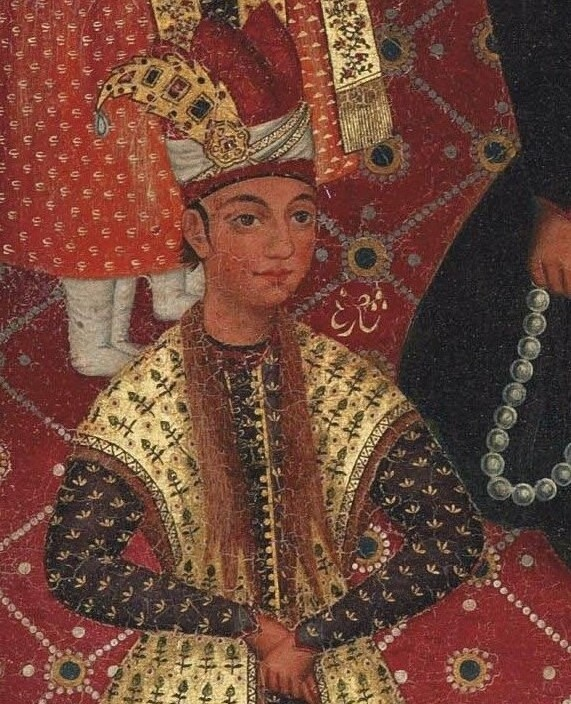
- Detail of Shahrokh Mirza, 18th century, by Ali Ashraf

Shah of Iran Ruler of Khorasan
- 1st Reign: 1 October 1748 – 14 January 1750
- Predecessor: Adel Shah
- Successor: Suleiman II (Safavid)
- 2nd Reign: 20 March 1750 – 1796
- Predecessor: Suleiman II
- Successor: Agha Mohammad Khan Qajar (Qajar)
- Born: March 1734; Mashhad, Safavid Iran
- Died: 1796 (aged 62); Damghan, Qajar Iran
- Spouse: Unnamed Jalayir wife
- Issue: Nasrollah Mirza; Nader Mirza
- Dynasty: Afsharid
- Father: Reza Qoli Mirza Afshar
- Mother: Fatemeh Soltan Begom
- Religion: Twelver Shia Islam

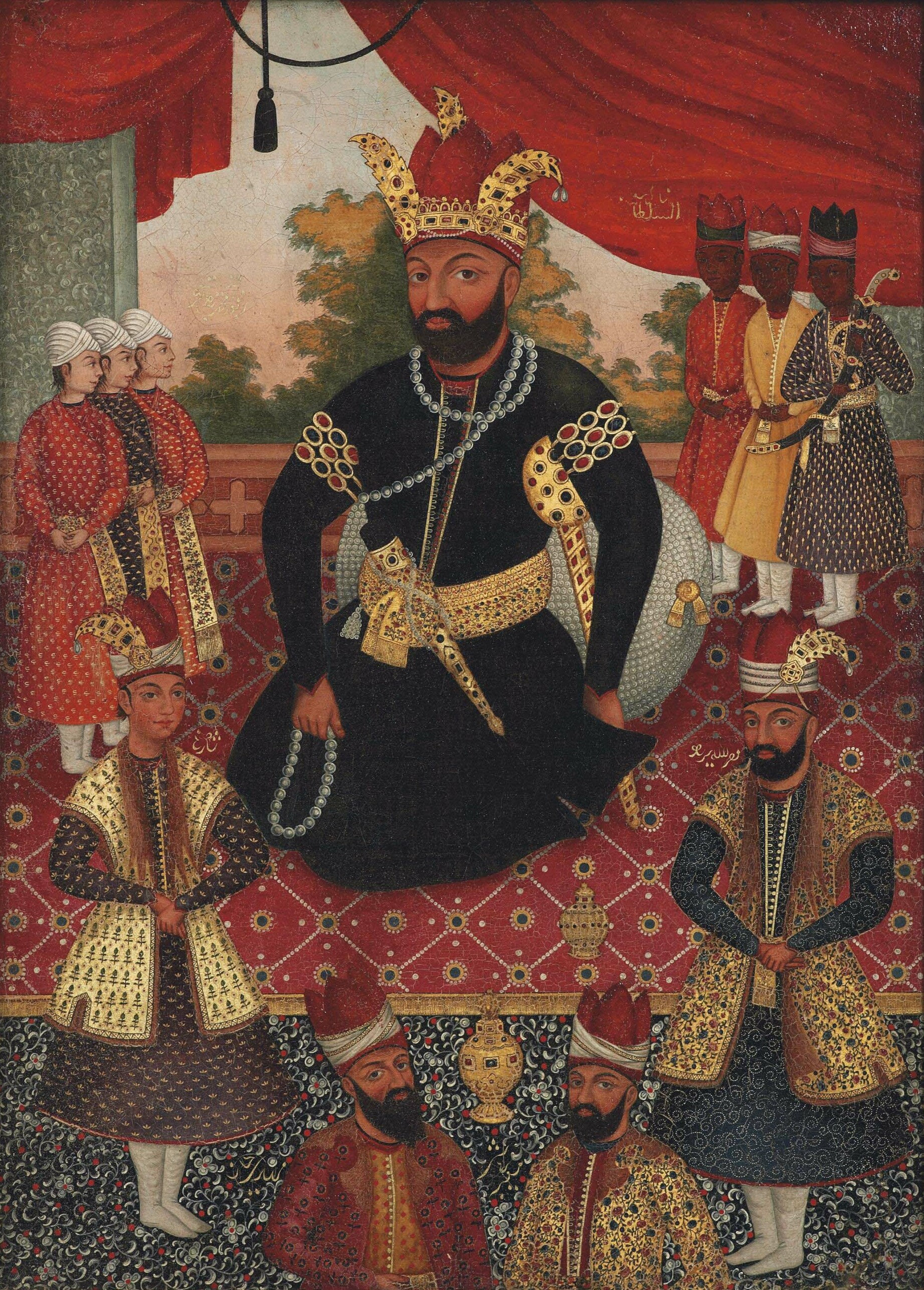
Shahrokh Shah with his grandfather Nader Shah

Shahrokh Mirza (Persian: شاهرخ‌میرزا; 1734–1796), better known by his dynastic title of Shahrokh Shah (شاهرخ‌ شاه), was the Afsharid king (shah) of the western part of Khorasan (corresponding to the present-day Khorasan Province) from 1748 to 1796, with a two-month interruption.

A grandson of the Iranian conqueror Nader Shah (r. 1736–1747), Shahrokh was the son of Reza Qoli Mirza Afshar and his Safavid wife Fatemeh Soltan Begom, who was the sister of Tahmasp II, the penultimate Safavid shah of Iran. Shahrokh's half-Safavid descent made him stand out amongst his Afsharid relatives and was used to bolster the legitimacy of his grandfather. After the assassination of Nader Shah in 1747, his nephew Ali-qoli Khan (who assumed the regnal name Adel Shah), ascended the throne in Mashhad and had all of Nader Shah's descendants in fortress of Kalat massacred.

Shahrokh was spared in case his Safavid lineage would come of use and was instead kept in the fortress as a prisoner. While Adel Shah was battling his rebellious younger brother Ebrahim Mirza, a party of Turkic, Kurdish, and Arab tribal leaders took advantage of his absence and installed Shahrokh on the throne. Both Adel Shah and Ebrahim were eventually defeated and killed, but Shahrokh was not long afterwards overthrown by a party of dissident tribal leaders, who installed the Safavid pretender Mir Sayyed Mohammad (who assumed the regnal name of Suleiman II) on the throne. Shahrokh was soon blinded at the instigation of Mir Alam Khan Khuzayma and other leading nobles, much against Suleiman II's will.

A group of conspirators led by the Turco-Mongol tribal leader Yusuf Ali Khan Jalayir eventually deposed Suleiman II and restored Shahrokh to the throne.

== Name ==
The name of "Shahrokh" (Persian: شاهرخ) was given to him by his grandfather Nader Shah (r. 1736–1747) in remembrance of Shah Rukh, the son and heir of the Turco-Mongol ruler Timur (r. 1370–1405). This was done by Nader Shah to publicly represent himself as a conqueror on the same level as Timur.

== Birth and lineage ==
After the coronation of the Safavid prince Tahmasp II as shah of Iran in 1730, Nader Shah married one of the latter's sisters, while his eldest son Reza Qoli Mirza Afshar married another of his sisters, Fatemeh Soltan Begom. In March 1734, Shahrokh was born from the union of Reza Qoli Afshar and Fatemeh Soltan Begom. The news reached the court in Isfahan on the day of Nowruz (Iranian New Year), with Nader Shah subsequently appointing Shahrokh the ruler of the city of Herat. With the birth of the half-Safavid Shahrokh, Nader Shah was able to bolster his legitimacy.

== Early life ==
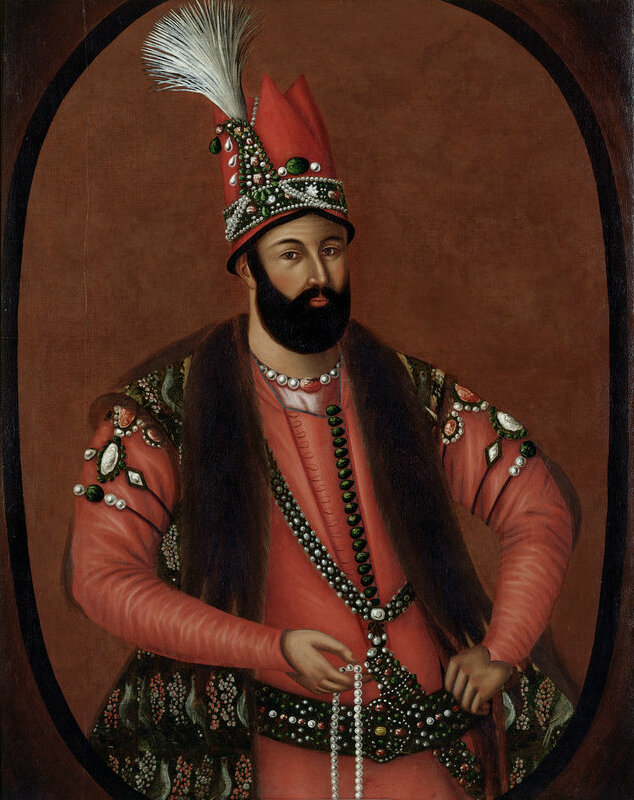
Portrait of Shahrokh's grandfather Nader Shah, who dismantled the Safavid dynasty of Iran and founded the Afsharid dynasty, ruling from 1736 to 1747

In 1740, after returning from his Indian campaign, Nader Shah minted coins in the name of Shahrokh in Herat. In 1747, as Nader Shah became increasingly paranoid, he had Shahrokh sent to the fortress of Kalat. Nader Shah was soon murdered afterwards, by mutinous officers, on 21 June 1747. His death led to a power vacuum, which resulted in his vast empire being divided by various sovereigns. The eastern parts of his domain were seized by Uzbek and Afghan sovereigns; a former Uzbek commander of Nader Shah named Muhammad Rahim Khan Manghit, deposed Abu al-Fayz Khan and became the new ruler of Bukhara; Ahmad Khan, the leader of the Abdali tribe and formerly part of the Afghan cadre of Nader Shah's army, fled to the city of Naderabad in Kandahar. There he assumed the title of Durr-i Durran ("Pearl of Pearls") and thus changed the name of his Abdali tribe to "Durrani." Ahmad Khan (now titled Ahmad Shah) then went on to conquer what had originally served as the frontier region between the Safavid and Mughal Empire.

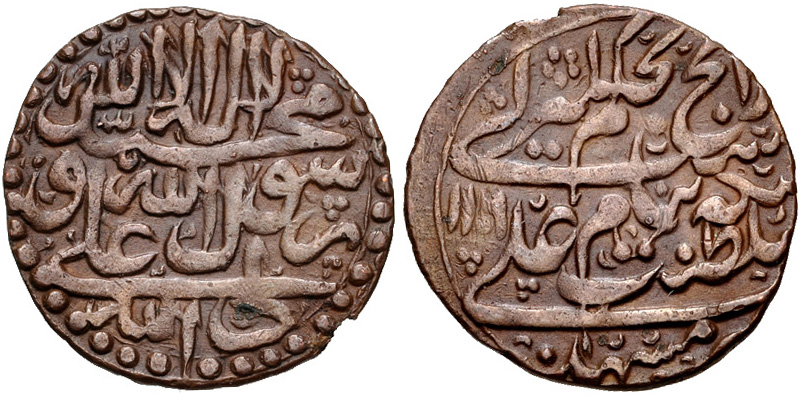
Coin minted in the name of Adel Shah, Mashhad mint

In Mashhad, its civil governor and superintendent of the Imam Reza Shrine, Mir Sayyed Mohammad drove the Afghans out of the city, securing it for Nader Shah's nephew Ali-qoli Khan, who may have had a hand in his uncle's murder. The latter had accepted the assassins of Nader Shah into his service, and had received an invitation to Mashhad by Mir Sayyed Mohammad. On 6 July 1747, Ali-qoli Khan ascended the throne and assumed the regnal name of Soltan Ali Adel Shah. Around the same time, he sent a small force to capture Kalat. The fortress was nearly impenetrable. However, the attackers got in by using an abandoned ladder on the edge one of the towers, which demonstrates that they had help from the inside. Adel Shah's men then massacred sixteen descendants of Nader Shah. They killed three sons of Nader Shah, five sons of Reza Qoli Mirza, and eight sons of Nasrollah Mirza. Two sons of Nader Shah, Nasrollah Mirza and Imam Qoli Mirza, successfully escaped together with Shahrokh (who was 14 at the time), but they were soon captured near the city of Marv. While the others were executed, Shahrokh was the only one that was spared, in case his Safavid lineage would come to use. He was instead sent back to Kalat, where he was imprisoned. False news regarding his death soon followed.

Preferring to revel in Mashhad, Adel Shah appointed his younger brother Ebrahim Mirza as the governor of Isfahan and its surroundings. Soon thereafter, Ebrahim declared independence and joined forces with his cousin Amir Aslan Khan Afshar, the governor of Azerbaijan. Adel Shah eventually marched against his brother, but many of his men deserted, and consequently he was defeated (in June 1748) and fled to the town of Tehran. There he was captured and blinded by its governor, Mirza Mohsen Khan, who then gave him over to Mir Sayyed Mohammad. The latter took Adel Shah back to Mashhad, where a group of Turkic, Kurdish, and Arab tribal leaders had taken advantage of his absence and declared Shahrokh the new shah on 1 October. Adel Shah was executed at the request of Shahrokh and the mother of Nasrollah Mirza. Shahrokh's compassionate behaviour and generosity with his treasure helped with the stabilization of Khorasan. This, along with his Safavid ancestry, resulted in him gaining a large following. His political and religious ideology differed from that of his grandfather. Contrary to Nader Shah, Shahrokh represented himself as an ardent champion of Twelver Shi'ism in his coins, seals, and documents.

== First reign ==
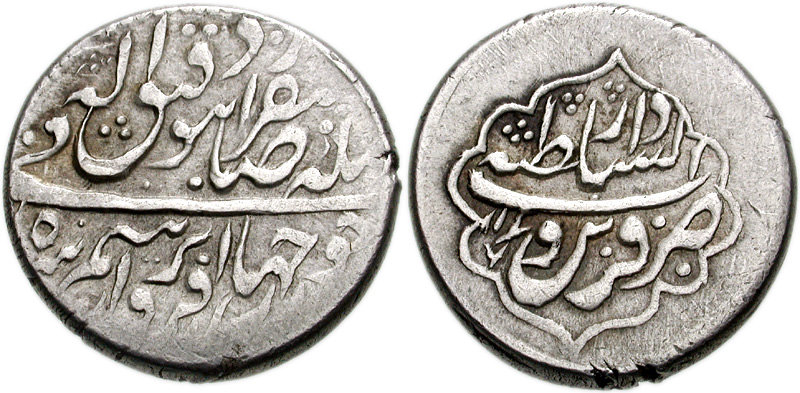
Coin minted in the name of Ebrahim Mirza, Qazvin mint

They summoned Ebrahim to acknowledge Shahrokh in person, but he declined. Pretending to have rebelled in support of Shahrokh, Ebrahim instead invited him to be crowned in Isfahan. The nobles of Khorasan, however, deciphered his true intentions and requested Ebrahim to appear at Mashhad as a token of goodwill. Seeing no further progress in the negotiations, Ebrahim revealed his real agenda and went to the city of Tabriz in Azerbaijan, where he was crowned shah on 8 December 1748. Following the counsel of the tribal leaders, Shahrokh assigned Musa Khan Afshar Taromi with the task to defeat Ebrahim Shah. A battle soon followed in June or July 1749 in the environs of Semnan, where Ebrahim Shah was forced to withdraw as a result of turmoil amongst his troops. Some of his Afghan and Uzbek troops deserted to Shahrokh, while others fled. Ebrahim Shah fled to the fortress of Qal'a-yi Qalapur, but was soon captured and given to Musa Khan Afshar Taromi, who had him blinded. He was then sent to Mashhad, but died en route.

With both Adel Shah and Ebrahim Shah dead, Shahrokh seemed to have been ridden of all his rivals. Although the Qajar chieftain Mohammad Hasan Khan Qajar initially defied him, he eventually capitulated to one of Shahrokh's commanders. However, Shahrokh only served as a figurehead, with the real power in the hands of Kurdish, Arabic, and Turkic tribal leaders. These tribal leaders did not share equal power, with those being side-lined joining the opposition against Shahrokh. These dissidents soon rallied around Mir Sayyed Mohammad, who due to his ancestry posed a serious threat to Shahrokh. Mir Sayyed Mohammad's father was Mirza Dawud, who had occupied high offices under the Safavid shah Sultan Husayn (r. 1694–1722), and married his sister Shahrbanu Begom, the mother of Mir Sayyed Mohammad.

Accounts differ on the relationship between Shahrokh and Mir Sayyed Mohammad; some portray Shahrokh as a hypocrite, who sought to have Mir Sayyed Mohammad killed, while others portray Mir Sayyed Mohammad as a usurper and a trickster, who was willing to do anything to seize the throne. Shahrokh promised Behbud Khan to make him vakil (regent) in exchange for killing Mir Sayyed Mohammad. Behbud Khan, however, declined, and was as a result arrested the following day in front of the court. As a result of this arrest, the Arab tribal leader Mir Alam Khan Khuzayma, along with sixteen other leaders approached Mir Sayyed Mohammad on 30 December 1749, where they offered him the throne, which the latter accepted. The conspirators later took advantage of the Turkic tribal leader Yusuf Ali Khan Jalayir's (the main supporter of Shahrokh) absence from Mashhad, and imprisoned Shahrokh, while installing Mir Sayyed Mohammad on the throne on 14 January 1750. Mir Sayyed Mohammad adopted the regnal name of Suleiman II as a claimant to the Safavid throne.

== Imprisonment ==
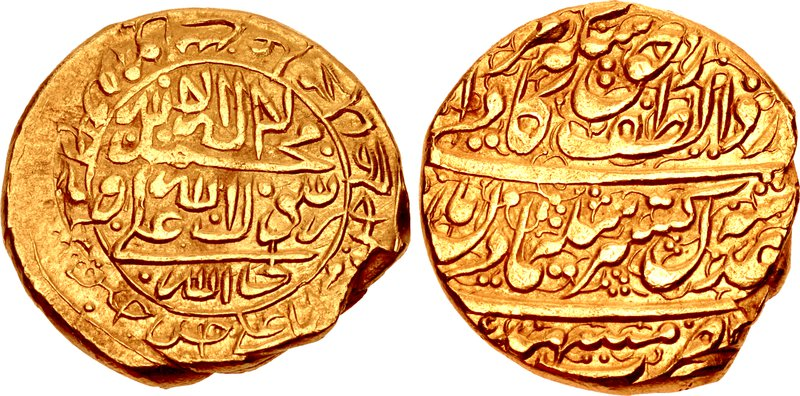
Coin minted in the name of Suleiman II at Mashhad in 1750

Mir Alam Khan (who had been appointed wakil) and the leading aristocrats soon decided that Shahrokh could not be kept alive. Suleiman II, however, was against this and assigned the previous ishikaqasi bashi (chamberlain) Mohammad Reza Beg as the warden of the Chaharbagh palace where Shahrokh was imprisoned. However, when Suleiman II went out to hunt at Radkan, Mir Alam Khan summoned Mohammad Reza Beg, while Amir Khan Qara'i and Amir Mehrab Khan entered the Chaharbagh without facing any resistance, blinding Shahrokh in the harem. Enraged, Suleiman II dismissed the plotters, only to restore them to their former offices a few days after.

Suleiman II soon started to grow unpopular amongst his subjects; he was in conflict with many tribal leaders due to the deposal of Shahrokh and wealthy landowners were discontent with a decree that exempted the people from taxation for three years. Not much long afterwards, the rivals of Suleiman II, under the leadership of Yusuf Ali Khan Jalayir, took advantage of the funeral of Mir Alam Khan's relative Amir Mehrab Khan, storming the Chaharbagh and blinding Suleiman II, who was imprisoned in Kalat. The leading figure behind this coup was the Jalayir wife of Shahrokh, who had convinced the conspirators that Shahrokh had not been blinded. When the tribal leaders discovered that Shahrokh was indeed blind, they put him on the throne anyway (on 20 March 1750), and made everyone believe that he was not blind and capable of ruling. Mir Alam Khan fled from Mashhad, while the other nobles accepted Shahrokh's rule.

== Second reign ==
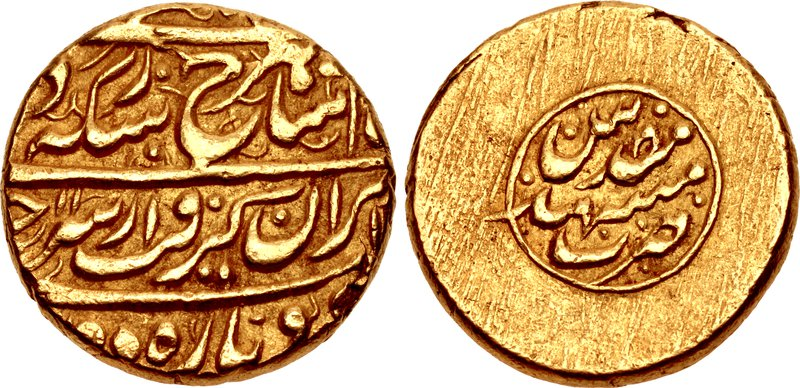
Coin minted in the name of Shahrokh Shah at Mashhad, between 1750–1755 The text on the Ashrafi coin of Shahrokh Shah (the last Afsharid Shah) reads: “Once again, the government of Iran has regained its youth.” The coin bears the inscription: “Coin of the true owner.”

The political situation in Khorasan was made unstable by these events. The tribal chiefs effectively rendered Shahrokh a figurehead, as they began to fight amongst themselves. Shortly after the restoration of Shahrokh to the throne, Ahmad Shah Durrani launched an invasion into Khorasan and captured Herat after a siege lasting several months. He then besieged Mashhad before moving on to Nishapur on 10 November. The bitter cold wreaked havoc among his men and the resistance led by the governor Jafar Khan Bayat forced him to abandon the siege in early 1751. With Ahmad Shah Durrani gone, the conflicts among the local chieftains resumed.

In 1751, the beglerbegi of Merv, Ali Naqi Khan Qajar, expelled Yusuf Ali Khan Jalayir from Mashhad. Later an alliance between Mir Alam Khan and Jafar Khan Za'faranlu, the Kurdish chieftain of Chenaran, took Mashhad from Ali Naqi Khan. In the spring of 1752, Mir Alam Khan expelled Jafar Khan Za'faranlu from Mashhad and allied with Yusuf Ali Khan. Four months later, Jafar Khan Za'faranlu regained Mashhad. In the Islamic year 1166 (November 1752 - October 1753), Mir Alam Khan regained Mashhad, imprisoned and blinded Yusuf Ali Khan, Jafar Khan Za'faranlu, and Amir Khan Qara'i. These tribal chieftains turned to Ahmad Shah Durrani for assistance, and on 1 May 1754, Ahmad Shah left the city of Kandahar and marched towards Khorasan, beginning his second campaign. In June–July 1754 Tun was captured, and on 23 July he began to besiege Mashhad. During the siege in the autumn of 1754 Mir Alam Khan was captured and executed by his former victims after the population of Sabzevar handed him over. On 1 December Mashhad surrendered to Ahmad Shah and on 9 May 1755 Shahrokh Shah was officially restored as king.

=== Final years and death ===
After Ahmad Shah Durrani's death in 1772, Shahrokh had become a pawn of the chieftains who had taken control of the surrounding cities and towns of the Afsharid capital of Mashhad. The most prominent of these chieftains was most likely Eshaq Khan, who preserved Torbat-e Heydarieh as his center of operations. In the eastern parts of the Alborz, Kurdish chieftains ruled over several fortresses, such as Bojnord and Quchan.

When the Qajar ruler Agha Mohammad Shah reached Mashhad as part of his conquest of Khorasan, Shahrokh, along with a prominent mujtahid named Mirza Mahdi, went to the Qajar encampment. There they were warmly received by Agha Mohammad Shah's nephew Hossein Qoli Khan. Shortly afterwards, Agha Mohammad Shah sent a force of 8,000 soldiers under Suleiman Khan Qajar, followed by Mirza Mahdi, to conquer Mashhad and affirm its citizens of the Shah's generosity. A day later, Agha Mohammad Shah, followed the customary of the famous Iranian shah Abbas the Great, and entered Mashhad by foot as a pilgrim to the Imam Reza shrine, whilst being teary eyed and kissing the ground. His pilgrimage continued for 23 days, where he seemed to be unaware of the politics of the country.

However, things quite instantly changed after that—Agha Mohammad Shah ordered the digging up of Nader Shah's corpse, and had it sent to Tehran, where it was reburied alongside Karim Khan Zand's remains. He then forced Shahrokh to give any riches that originally belonged to Nader Shah. Shahrokh vowed that he did not possess any more of Nader Shah's riches. Agha Mohammad Shah, ruthless and revengeful, and with a desire for treasures, disbelieved him, and had him tortured severely to confess the hidden locations of the last gems passed down to him from his grandfather, Nader. Shahrokh initially refused to speak, going through severe torture; however, he eventually confessed the locations of the gems. Shahrokh was sent to Mazandaran with his family, but died at Damghan due to the injuries he had suffered from his tortures.

== Sources ==
- Axworthy, Michael (2006). The Sword of Persia: Nader Shah, from Tribal Warrior to Conquering Tyrant. I.B.Tauris. ISBN 978-1850437062.
- Barati, András (2019). "The Succession Struggle Following the Death of Nādir Shāh (1747–1750)". Orpheus Noster 11/4: 44–58.
- Hambly, Gavin R. G. (1991). "Agha Muhammad Khan and the establishment of the Qajar dynasty". In Avery, Peter; Hambly, Gavin R. G.; Melville, Charles Peter (eds.). The Cambridge History of Iran: From Nadir Shah to the Islamic Republic. Vol. 7. Cambridge: Cambridge University Press. pp. 104–144. ISBN 0-521-20095-4.
- Hussein-zadeh, Huda Seyyed; Negahban, Farzin (2008). "Afshārids". In Madelung, Wilferd; Daftary, Farhad (eds.). Encyclopaedia Islamica Online. Brill Online. ISSN 1875-9831.
- Karimi, Christine Noelle (2014). The Pearl in Its Midst: Herat and the Mapping of Khurasan (15th-19th Centuries). Austrian Academy of Sciences. pp. 110–127. ISBN 9783700172024.
- Nejatie, Sajjad (2017). "Iranian Migrations in the Durrani Empire". Comparative Studies of South Asia, Africa and the Middle East. 37. Project Muse: 494–509. doi:10.1215/1089201x-4279212. S2CID 148940975.
- Perry, John R. (1979). Karim Khan Zand: A History of Iran, 1747-1779. University of Chicago Press. ISBN 978-0226660981.
- Perry, John. R. (1984). "Afsharids". Encyclopædia Iranica, Vol. I, online edition, Fasc. 6. New York. pp. 587–589.
- Perry, John. R. (1997). "Ebrāhīm Shah Afšār". Encyclopædia Iranica, Vol. VIII, online edition, Fasc. 1. New York. pp. 75–76.
- Perry, John. R. (1991). "The Zand dynasty". In Avery, Peter; Hambly, Gavin R. G.; Melville, Charles Peter (eds.). The Cambridge History of Iran: From Nadir Shah to the Islamic Republic. Vol. 7. Cambridge: Cambridge University Press. pp. 63–104. ISBN 0-521-20095-4.
- Roemer, H. R. (1986). "The Safavid period". In Lockhart, Laurence; Jackson, Peter (eds.). The Cambridge History of Iran: The Timurid and Safavid Periods. Vol. 6. Cambridge: Cambridge University Press. pp. 189–351. ISBN 0-521-20094-6.
- Tucker, Ernest (2012). "Afshārids". In Fleet, Kate; Krämer, Gudrun; Matringe, Denis; Nawas, John; Rowson, Everett (eds.). Encyclopaedia of Islam (3rd ed.). Brill Online. ISSN 1873-9830.
- Tucker, Ernest S. (2006). Nadir Shah's Quest for Legitimacy in Post-Safavid Iran. University Press of Florida. ISBN 978-0813029641.

Shahrokh Shah Afsharid dynasty Born: 1734 Died: 1796
Regnal titles
Preceded by Ebrahim Shah Afshar	Shah of Iran (1st time); 1748–1749	Succeeded by Suleiman II
Preceded by Suleiman II	Shah of Iran (2nd time); 1750–1760	Succeeded by Karim Khan Zand
Preceded by Ebrahim Shah Afshar	Ruler of Azerbaijan (as part of Iran); 1748–1749	Succeeded by Azad Khan Afghan
Preceded by Ebrahim Shah Afshar	Ruler of Mazandaran (as part of Iran); 1748–1749	Succeeded by Mohammad Hasan Khan Qajar
Preceded by Suleiman II	Ruler of Khorasan; 1748–1796	Succeeded by Agha Mohammad Khan Qajar
