= Adel Shah =

Shah of Iran from 1747 to 1748

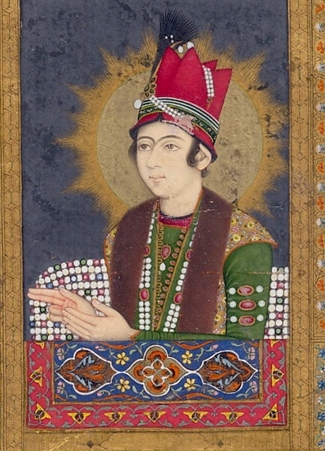
- Portrait of Adel Shah. From the St. Petersburg Album. Created in Iran, dated c. 1748

Shah of Iran
- Reign: 6 July 1747 – 1 October 1748
- Predecessor: Nader Shah
- Successor: Ebrahim Afshar
- Died: 1749; Mashhad, Afsharid Iran
- Spouse: Princess Ketevan of Kakheti
- Dynasty: Afsharid
- Father: Ebrahim Khan
- Religion: Twelver Shia Islam

Ali-qoli Khan (Persian: علیقلی‌خان), commonly known by his regnal title Adel Shah (also spelled Adil; عادل‌شاه, "the Just King") was the second shah of Afsharid Iran, ruling from 1747 to 1748. He was the nephew and successor of Nader Shah (r. 1736–1747), the founder of the Afsharid dynasty.

Adel Shah ruled a considerably smaller realm than that of his predecessor. His rule was only secured in eastern Iran, and he later attempted to secure it in western Iran as well. Unsuccessful, he was soon deposed by his brother Ebrahim Afshar, who had established his rule in western Iran and now declared himself shah.

== Family and early career ==
Not much is known about the life of Ali-qoli Khan before his secession to the Afsharid throne. He was the eldest son of Ebrahim Khan, a brother of Nader Shah (r. 1736–1747), the founder of the Afsharid dynasty of Iran. Ali-qoli Khan attended the coronation of Nader Shah on 8 March 1736, where he was amongst the figures who were adjacent to the latter.

In 1737, Ali-qoli Khan was given the governorship of Mashhad, as well as married Ketevan, daughter of the Georgian king Teimuraz II (r. 1732–1744). In 1740 he was also married to a daughter of Abu al-Fayz Khan (r. 1711–1747), the ruler of the Khanate of Bukhara, which had been recently subjugated by the Afsharids. From 1743 to 1747, Ali-qoli khan commanded Nader's troops against the Yazidis of Kurdistan, the Karakalpaks and Uzbeks of Khwarazm and in Sistan. He then ran in trouble with his uncle over the latter's decision to levy 100,000 tomans on him combined with Nader's suspiciousness. In April 1747, in conjunction with the rebels of Sistan, Ali-qoli khan occupied Herat and induced the Kurds to enter into a rebellion. Nader, while marching against the insurgents, was murdered by a group of his officers, who then offered the crown to Ali-qoli.

Nader Shah was soon murdered afterwards, by mutinous officers, on June 21, 1747. His death led to a power vacuum, which resulted in his vast empire being divided by various sovereigns. The eastern parts of his domain were seized by Uzbek and Afghan sovereigns; a former Uzbek commander of Nader Shah named Muhammad Rahim Khan Manghit, deposed Abu al-Fayz Khan and became the new ruler of Bukhara; Ahmad Khan, the leader of the Abdali tribe and formerly part of the Afghan cadre of Nader Shah's army, fled to the city of Naderabad in Kandahar. There he assumed the title of Durr-i Durran (Pearl of Pearls) and thus changed the name of his Abdali tribe to "Durrani." Ahmad Khan (now titled Ahmad Shah) then went on conquer what had originally served as the frontier region between the Safavid and Mughal Empire.

In Mashhad, its civil governor and superintendent of the Imam Reza Shrine, Mir Sayyed Mohammad drove the Afghans out of the city, securing it for Nader Shah's nephew Ali-qoli Khan, who may have had a hand in his uncle's murder. The latter had accepted the assassins of Nader Shah into his service, and had received an invitation to Mashhad by Mir Sayyed Mohammad.

== Reign ==
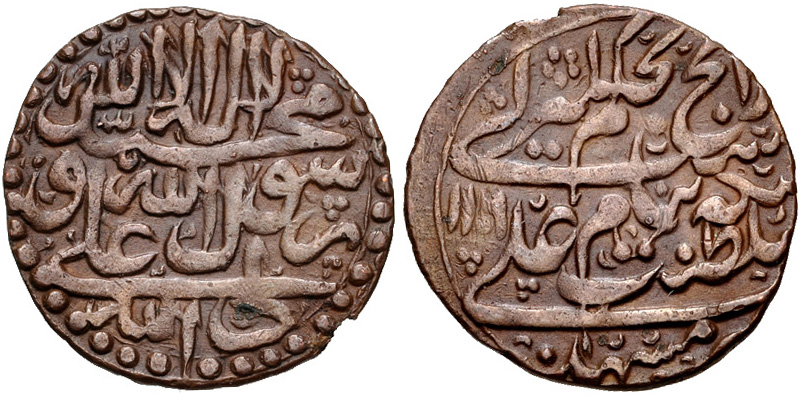
Coin minted during the reign of Adel Shah. Mashhad mint, dated 1747/48

On 6 July 1747, Ali-qoli Khan ascended the throne and assumed the regnal name of Soltan Ali Adel Shah. Around the same time, he sent a small force to capture Kalat; the fortress was nearly impenetrable, however, the army eventually breached it by using an abandoned ladder on the edge one of the towers, which demonstrates that they had help from the inside. Adel Shah's men massacred sixteen descendants of Nader Shah, which included three sons of Nader Shah, five sons of Reza Qoli Mirza and eight sons of Nasrollah Mirza. Two sons of Nader Shah, Nasrollah Mirza and Imam Qoli Mirza successfully escaped together with Nader Shah's grandson Shahrokh (who was 14 at the time), but they were soon captured near the city of Marv. While the others were executed, Shahrokh was the only one that was spared, in case his Safavid lineage would come to use. He was instead sent back to Kalat, where he was imprisoned. False news regarding his death soon followed.

Preferring to revel in Mashhad, Adel Shah appointed his younger brother Ebrahim Mirza as the governor of Isfahan and its surroundings. Soon thereafter, Ebrahim declared independence and joined forces with his cousin Amir Aslan Khan Afshar, the governor of Azerbaijan. Adel Shah eventually marched towards his brother, but lost a substantial amount of his men due to desertion, and was consequently defeated (in June 1748) and fled to the town of Tehran. There he was captured and blinded by its governor, Mirza Mohsen Khan, who then gave him over to Mir Sayyed Mohammad. The latter took Adel Shah back to Mashhad, where a group of Turkic, Kurdish and Arab tribal leaders had taken advantage of his absence and declared Shahrokh the new shah on 1 October. Adel Shah was executed at the request of Shahrokh and the mother of Nasrollah Mirza.

== Sources ==
- Axworthy, Michael (2006). The Sword of Persia: Nader Shah, from Tribal Warrior to Conquering Tyrant. I.B.Tauris. ISBN 978-1850437062.
- Barati, András (2019). "The Succession Struggle Following the Death of Nādir Shāh (1747–1750)". Orpheus Noster 11/4: 44–58.
- Hambly, Gavin R. G. (1991). "Agha Muhammad Khan and the establishment of the Qajar dynasty". In Avery, Peter; Hambly, Gavin R. G.; Melville, Charles Peter (eds.). The Cambridge History of Iran: From Nadir Shah to the Islamic Republic. Vol. 7. Cambridge: Cambridge University Press. pp. 104–144. ISBN 0-521-20095-4.
- Hussein-zadeh, Huda Seyyed; Negahban, Farzin (2008). "Afshārids". In Madelung, Wilferd; Daftary, Farhad (eds.). Encyclopaedia Islamica Online. Brill Online. ISSN 1875-9831.
- Nejatie, Sajjad (2017). "Iranian Migrations in the Durrani Empire". Comparative Studies of South Asia, Africa and the Middle East. 37. Project Muse: 494–509. doi:10.1215/1089201x-4279212. S2CID 148940975.
- Perry, John R. (1979). Karim Khan Zand: A History of Iran, 1747–1779. University of Chicago Press. ISBN 978-0226660981.
- Perry, John. R. (1983). "ʿĀdel Shah Afšār". In Yarshater, Ehsan (ed.). Encyclopædia Iranica. Vol. I/5: Adat–Afghanistan. London and New York: Routledge & Kegan Paul. p. 452. ISBN 978-0-71009-094-2.
- Perry, John. R. (1984). "Afsharids". Encyclopædia Iranica, Vol. I, online edition, Fasc. 6. New York. pp. 587–589.
- Perry, John. R. (1997). "Ebrāhīm Shah Afšār". Encyclopædia Iranica, Vol. VIII, online edition, Fasc. 1. New York. pp. 75–76.
- Perry, John. R. (1991). "The Zand dynasty". In Avery, Peter; Hambly, Gavin R. G.; Melville, Charles Peter (eds.). The Cambridge History of Iran: From Nadir Shah to the Islamic Republic. Vol. 7. Cambridge: Cambridge University Press. pp. 63–104. ISBN 0-521-20095-4.
- Roemer, H. R. (1986). "The Safavid period". In Lockhart, Laurence; Jackson, Peter (eds.). The Cambridge History of Iran: The Timurid and Safavid Periods. Vol. 6. Cambridge: Cambridge University Press. pp. 189–351. ISBN 0-521-20094-6.
- Tapper, Richard (1997). Frontier Nomads of Iran: A Political and Social History of the Shahsevan. Cambridge University Press. ISBN 978-0-52158-336-7.
- Tucker, Ernest (2012). "Afshārids". In Fleet, Kate; Krämer, Gudrun; Matringe, Denis; Nawas, John; Rowson, Everett (eds.). Encyclopaedia of Islam (3rd ed.). Brill Online. ISSN 1873-9830.
- Tucker, Ernest S. (2006). Nadir Shah's Quest for Legitimacy in Post-Safavid Iran. University Press of Florida. pp. 1–176. ISBN 978-0813029641.

Adel Shah Afsharid dynasty Born: ? Died: 1749
Iranian royalty
Preceded by Nader Shah	Shah of Iran; 1747–1748	Succeeded by Ebrahim Shah
