= Battle of Herat (1729) =

Battle of Nader's campaigns

- Part of Nader's Campaigns
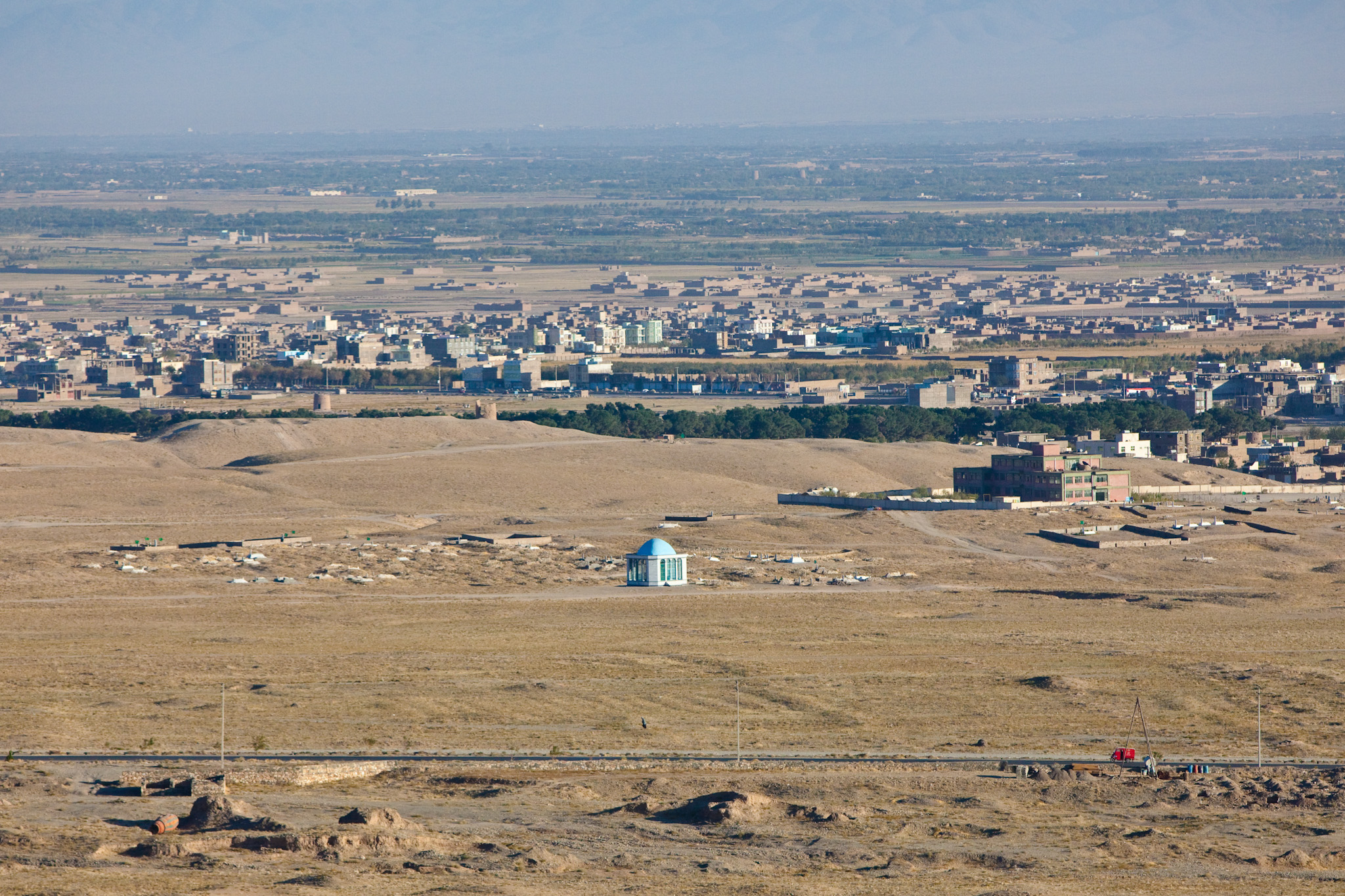
- The countryside of Herat today
Date	July, 1729
Location	Herat, Afghanistan
Result	Safavid victory

Belligerents
Safavid Loyalists	Abdali Afghans

Commanders and leaders
Nader	Allahyar Khan Abdali (surrendered); Zulfiqar Khan Abdali

Casualties and losses
3,000	Heavy

The Battle of Herat (Persian: نبرد هرات) was fought between the military forces from the Abdali Afghans and the army of the Safavid Iran on July 1729

== Background ==
After the defeat of Afghans at the Battle of Kafer Qal'eh Allahyar Khan with several Abdali leaders went to Nader at his camp near outside the gates of Herat and asked for peace Nader agreed to accept peace on the condition that they surrender their artillery After these returned to Herat a messenger from Zulfiqar Khan brought Allahyar Khan a message that reinforcements would arrive soon and that he would not surrender so he refused to surrender the artilleryZulfiqar Khan's forces entered the city at night through the southern gates of the city and joined Allahyar Khan forces.

== Battle and Fall of Herat ==
At sunrise the Abdali forces began attacking Nader's camp with cold weapons Nader Shah ordered the cavalry that was advancing towards Farah to turn back and attack the HeratNader with the help of his cavalry, decided to provoke and draw the entire Abdali army into battle so that he could draw them close and use his cannons against them He sent his cavalry in small groups towards the Abdali army and encouraged the Abdali cavalry and infantry to fight. The Abdali, who were confident due to the strong fortress of Herat behind them, attacked Nader's retreating cavalry when they reached the range of Nader's army the heavy fire of the cannons and 15,000 firearms of Nader's army even prevented many of the Abdali forces from returning and inflicted heavy casualties on them The remaining Abdali forces quickly reached the castle and took refuge there.Nader decided to conquer the Herat, so he bombarded the city with cannons As the artillery fire intensified on the city, many houses and buildings were damaged The restless people of the city pressured Allahyar Khan and forced him to accept peace and surrender the city to Nader. He sent a letter of complaint to Nader asking for forgiveness, and Nader released them because they had surrendered the city. And the city was conquered by Safavids again.

== See also ==
- Herat Campaign of 1731
- Herat

== Sources ==
- Michael Axworthy, The Sword of Persia: Nader Shah, from Tribal Warrior to Conquering Tyrant Hardcover 348 pages (26 July 2006) Publisher: I.B. Tauris Language: English ISBN 1-85043-706-8
- Larudi, Nurullah (2008). Nader, Son of the Sword. Tehran: Parse. ISBN 978-600-5026-56-6.
- Ghafouri, Ali (2009). History of Iranian Wars. Tehran. ISBN 978-964-423-738-6.
- Shabani Reza (2009). History of Iran in the Afsharid era. Tehran ISBN 978-964-372-362-0
