= Suleiman II =

Suleiman II may refer to:

- Suleiman II of the Ottoman Empire
- Suleiman II of Persia
- Suleiman II of Rûm
- Suleiman II of Cordoba
