= Battle of Dilaram =

1720 Battle between the Hotaks and Abdalis

Date	August 1720
Location	Delaram, western Afghanistan
Result	Hotaki victory

Belligerents
Hotak dynasty	Sadozai Sultanate of Herat

Commanders and leaders
Mahmud Hotak	Asadullah Khan †

Strength
Unknown	Unknown

Casualties and losses
Unknown	3,000 killed

The Battle of Dilaram was fought near Farah between Mahmud Hotak and Abdali leader Asadullah Khan. Mahmud won decisively, killing Asadullah and 3,000 of his men.

== Background ==
On the 19th of May 1719, a Persian force numbering about 30,000–35,000 men including an artillery train commanded by European officers advanced on Herat under Safi Quli Khan. Mohammad Zaman Khan, commanding roughly 15,000 Afghan fighters, chose to make his stand at Kafir Qala, a fortified outpost west of Herat near the frontier with Persia. Foreseeing the Persians' reliance on artillery, Asadullah placed his men behind orchard trees and in irrigation ditches to neutralize enemy fire. When the Persians commenced their bombardment, the Afghan positions held firm. As the Persian infantry advanced, they were met by concentrated flanking fire.

After several hours of heavy fighting, a Persian gunner accidentally ignited a powder magazine, and the ensuing explosion engulfed the artillery park in smoke. In the confusion, Persian gunners began firing upon their own troops. Sensing the disarray, Mohammad Zaman Khan ordered a full cavalry charge. The Afghan horsemen swept through the shattered Persian lines, routing the enemy. Safi Quli Khan was slain, and according to contemporary accounts, the Persian general, realizing the battle was lost, mounted a barrel of gunpowder and blew himself up rather than be captured.

== Battle ==
Asadullah Khan then set out for the Helmand and in August 1720. Asadullah Khan, leader of the Abdali Afghans attacked the fort of Farah from the Hotaks. Mahmud Hotak hearing this, gathered his men from Kandahar and met the rebel at Dilārām near Farah, The outcome of the battle remained in the balance for many hours until Asad Allah was shot in the back by a man who was settling an old score with Sultan Abdallah Khan’s family. in western Afghanistan. The battle was on favour of Mahmud Hotak and Asadullah was defeated and killed, along with 3,000 of his men.

== Aftermath ==
Mahmud sent the head of Asadullah Khan and some of the Abdalis to Soltan Hosein as a gesture of loyalty. Shah Soltan Hosein, showing his usual simplicity and wishful thinking, accepted this ruse at face value. H. R. Roemer, in the Cambridge History of Iran, dates the episode to 1132 AH (1719–20). He states that the shah read the gift as proof of loyalty, made Mahmud governor-general with the title of Husain Quli Khan and sent him a royal robe of honour. In Roemer's view nobody at court considered that the gesture might be a ploy to disarm Persian suspicion. Mahmud Hotak would later launch an invasion of Persia. The campaign targeted the city of Kerman, a strategically vital urban center in southeastern Safavid Iran. Mahmud Hotak's forces besieged and eventually captured the city, subsequently sacking it.
