= Afsharid dynasty =

1736–1796 Iranian dynasty of Turkoman origin

Afsharid
- Seal of Nader Shah

- Imperial flag of Nader Shah
- Parent family: Afshar tribe
- Country: Afsharid Iran
- Origin: Dastgerd, Iran
- Founded: 1736
- Founder: Nader Shah
- Final ruler: Shahrokh Shah
- Final head: Nader Mirza Afshar
- Titles: Shah of Iran
- Traditions: Twelver Shia Islam
- Deposition: 1796

The Afsharid dynasty (Persian: دودمان افشاریان, romanized: Dudemān-e Afshāriyān) was an Iranian dynasty founded by Nader Shah (r. 1736–1747) of the Qirqlu clan of the Turkoman Afshar tribe, ruling over Afsharid Iran.

== List of Afsharid monarchs ==
No.	Shah	Portrait	Reigned from	Reigned until	Time in office	Seal	Coinage
1	Nader Shah		8 March 1736	20 June 1747	11 years, 104 days		
2	Adel Shah		6 July 1747	1 October 1748	1 year, 87 days	—N/a	
3	Shahrokh Shah		1 October 1748	14 January 1750	1 year, 105 days	—N/a	
4	Ebrahim Afshar	—N/a	8 December 1748	June-July 1749	205 days	—N/a	
5	Shahrokh Shah		20 March 1750	1796	45 years, 287 days	—N/a	

== Family tree ==
Imam Qoli (d. 1704)
Ebrahim Khan (d. 1738)	Nader Shah (r. 1736–1747)^{1}
Adel Shah (r. 1747–1748)^{2}	Ebrahim Afshar (r. 1748–1749)^{4}	Reza Qoli Mirza (b. 1719 – d.1747)
Shahrokh Shah (r. 1748–1750)^{3} (r. 1750–1796)^{5}
Nader Mirza (d. 1803)

== Sources ==
- Amanat, Abbas (1997). Pivot of the Universe: Nasir Al-Din Shah Qajar and the Iranian Monarchy, 1831–1896. I. B.Tauris. ISBN 978-1845118280.
- Amanat, Abbas (2017). Iran: A Modern History. Yale University Press. pp. 1–992. ISBN 978-0300112542.
- Axworthy, Michael (2006). The Sword of Persia: Nader Shah, from Tribal Warrior to Conquering Tyrant. I.B.Tauris. ISBN 978-1850437062.
- Fisher, William Bayne; Avery, P.; Hambly, G. R. G; Melville, C. (1991). The Cambridge History of Iran. Vol. 7. Cambridge: Cambridge University Press. ISBN 0521200954.
- Bulookbashi, Ali A.; Negahban, Farzin (2008). "Afshār". In Madelung, Wilferd; Daftary, Farhad (eds.). Encyclopaedia Islamica Online. Brill Online. ISSN 1875-9831.
- Oberling, P. (1984). "AFŠĀR". In Yarshater, Ehsan (ed.). Encyclopædia Iranica. Vol. I/6: Afghanistan–Ahriman. London and New York: Routledge & Kegan Paul. pp. 582–586. ISBN 978-0-71009-095-9.
- Stöber, Georg (2010). "Afshār". In Fleet, Kate; Krämer, Gudrun; Matringe, Denis; Nawas, John; Rowson, Everett (eds.). Encyclopaedia of Islam (3rd ed.). Brill Online. ISSN 1873-9830.
- Tucker, Ernest (2012). "Afshārids". In Fleet, Kate; Krämer, Gudrun; Matringe, Denis; Nawas, John; Rowson, Everett (eds.). Encyclopaedia of Islam (3rd ed.). Brill Online. ISSN 1873-9830.

— Royal house — Afsharid dynasty Founding year: 1736 Deposition: 1796
Preceded by House of Safavid	Ruling house of Iran; 1736–1796	Succeeded by House of Zand
