= Ali Akbar Abdolrashidi =

Iranian journalist, translator and writer (born 1949)

- علی‌اکبر عبدالرشیدی
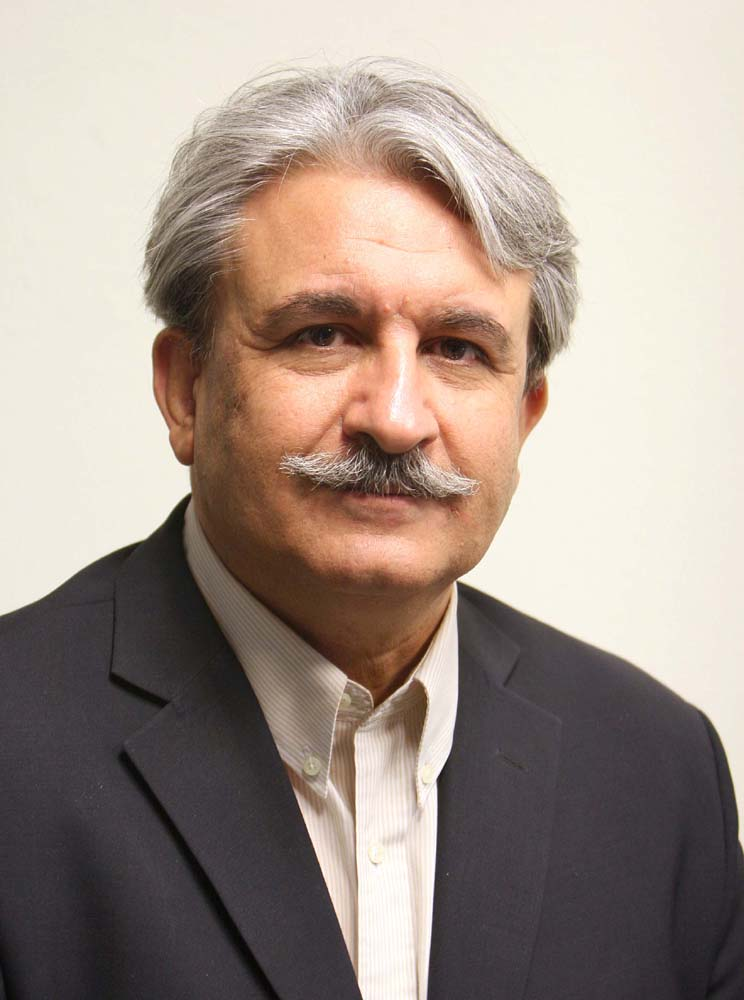
- Ali Akbar Abdolrashidi
- Born: 9 July 1949 (age 76); Kerman, Iran
- Occupations: Lecturer, writer, traveler, translator, television host, journalist, intellectual

Ali Akbar Abdolrashidi (Persian: علی‌اکبر عبدالرشیدی; born 9 July 1949 in Kerman) is an Iranian intellectual, journalist, writer, traveler, television host, translator, and university lecturer. During his lengthy career as a journalist, Abdolrashidi conducted hundreds of television interviews with notable international figures, such as Fidel Castro, Rajiv Gandhi, and Muammar al-Gaddafi. For most of his career, Abdolrashidi has worked for the Islamic Republic of Iran Broadcasting (IRIB).

== Early career ==
Abdolrashidi started his career in the early 1960s, while still a teenager. It was then that he began to work for a radio station in Kerman. Following this, he joined the national radio network as a researcher, working for a weekly program on folklore.

== Journalism ==
On becoming competent in English, he joined the news and current-affairs department and worked as a translator of newswires. After seven years, he became the London-based correspondent of the IRIB in 1980. A year later, however, he returned to Iran at the IRIB headquarters in Tehran, where he headed the foreign news desk and travelled the world to cover current events in the United Nations, OPEC, and other international organizations.

In 1984, Abdolrashidi returned to London as the British and European correspondent. He covered many historic events such as the fall of the Berlin Wall, the collapse of the Soviet Union, and the formation of the European Union.

== Works ==
Abdolrashidi has visited 40 countries and written and translated a total of twenty books, (at 2012) and is the author of hundreds of articles and essays. He is an amateur photographer and displays some of his works on the Internet.

== Awards ==
Abdolrashidi has received numerous awards for his work as a journalist. His major award is the Japanese Hoso Bunka Foundation top award for a Documentary called Hejran or Dislocation.This documentary is about the " Plights of Asian Immigrants". 'Hejran' reveals the plights of those immigrants who head for an unknown happy life, after leaving their homeland, members of families and their background. Reaching the new land with a new life, they find it quite different from what they imagined.
