= Ebrahim Khan Afshar =

18th century Iranian military commander and statesman

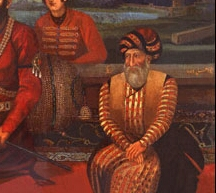
- Ebrahim Afshar by Abu'l-Hasan Mostawfi Ghaffari c. 1774
- Born: Mashhad, Safavid Iran
- Died: 1738; Jar, Jar-Balakan
- Issue: Ebrahim Afshar; Adel Shah
- Dynasty: Afsharid
- Father: Emam Qoli

Ebrahim Khan Afshar (Persian: ابراهیم‌خان افشار) was a military commander and statesman during the 18th century in Afsharid Iran. He was the younger brother of the Shah of Iran, Nader Shah, and was appointed to high office after Nader came to prominence due to his military campaigns which restored the Safavid dynasty to power.

In 1730 during Nader's initial campaign against the Ottomans, Ebrahim was tasked with defending Mashhad from potential invasions. When the Abdali rebels assaulted the walls of the fort, Ebrahim, seeking glory due to having lived in the shadow of his brother launched a sortie which ended in a disastrous defeat. He was replaced with his nephew, Reza Qoli and lacking artillery, the Abdalis had to retreat.

He returned to the good graces of his family in 1732 after successfully occupying Farah from the Afghans and defeating a force of Turcomen in Khorasan around Nowruz of that year.

Although he commanded men under the authority of his brother throughout the early Naderian wars, he never held any independent commands until being given autonomous command over the Iranian army in the Caucasus. At the same time that Nader Shah launched his invasion of the Hotak homeland, meant for a spring-board for the invasion of Mughal India, Ebrahim Kham took the field against the Lezgis in Daghestan.

The campaign in Daghestan began well for Ebrahim; he was able to force a pitched battle with the Lezgis, which he won. However, he was later ambushed in a valley by a small band of Lezgis who fell upon his meagre company of riders and slew him. His body was initially treated with respect and buried, but was later removed from its coffin, hung from a tree and burned.

Ebrahim's sons Adel and Ebrahim later ruled over Iran.

== See also ==
- Nader Shah
- Afsharid Iran
- Afsharid dynasty
- Nader Shah's Dagestan campaign
- Herat Campaign of 1730-1732
