= Suleiman II of Persia =

Safavid pretender and briefly ruler of parts of Iran (1714–1763)

Suleiman II
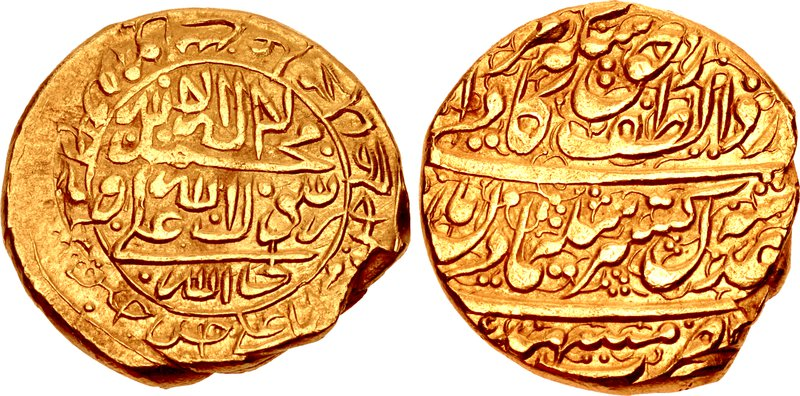
- Coin of Suleiman II

Shah of Iran
- Reign: 17 December 1749–14 January 1750
- Coronation: 17 December 1749
- Predecessor: Shahrokh Shah
- Successor: Shahrokh Shah
- Born: June 1714; Isfahan, Safavid Iran
- Died: May 1763 (aged 48); Mashhad, Afsharid Iran
- Spouse: Khan Agha Begum
- Issue: Sultan Daud Mirza; Sultan Ali Mirza; Sultan Hasan Mirza; Sultan Qasim Mirza; Sultan Hashim Mirza
- Dynasty: Safavid
- Father: Mir Sayyed Mohammad Marashi
- Mother: Shahbanu Begum Safavi
- Religion: Shia Islam

Mir Sayyed Muhammad Marashi (June 1714 – May 1763), better known by his dynastic name of Suleiman II (Persian: شاه سلیمان), was a Safavid pretender who managed to briefly become ruler of some parts of Iran from 1749 to 1750. He was in charge of the affairs of the Imam Reza shrine in Mashhad.

The young Shahrokh, who was a grandson of the Iranian conqueror Nader Shah (r. 1736–1747), was enthroned at Mashhad in October 1748 by Iranian nobles. Two months later Nader Shah's nephew Ebrahim Mirza, proclaimed himself shah; but he was defeated and fled. Sayyid Muhammad refused to admit him to the shrine city of Mashad. Sayyid Mohammad's mother was the daughter of Safavid shah Suleiman I, and so in 1750 he was enthroned by Mir Alam Khan Khuzaima and some Kurdish and Jalayirid chiefs as Suleiman II. Shahrokh was blinded but was restored to the throne after only a few months, as Suleiman II was removed and blinded.

== Ancestry ==
Ancestors of Suleiman II of Persia

8. Sayyed Muhammad Shafi al-Marashi
4. Sayyed ‘Abdu’llah al-Marashi
2. Mir Sayyed Mohammad al-Marashi
10. Simon II of Kartli
5. ‘Izz-i-Sharaf
11. Jahan Banu Begum (granddaughter of Abbas I of Persia)
1. Suleiman II of Persia
12. Abbas II of Persia
6. Suleiman I of Persia
13. Nakihat Khanum
3. Shahbanu Begum Safavi

== Sources ==
- Floor, Willem (2005), "A Note on The Grand Vizierate in Seventeenth Century Persia", Zeitschrift der Deutschen Morgenländischen Gesellschaft, 155 (2), Harrassowitz Verlag: 435–481, JSTOR 43382107

Preceded by Shahrokh Shah	Shah of Iran; 1749–1750	Succeeded by Shahrokh Shah
