= Ebrahim Afshar =

Shah of Persia from July to September 1748

Ebrahim Shah
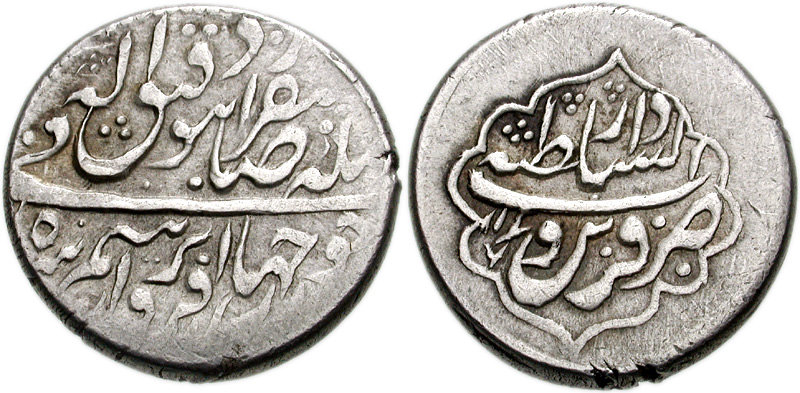
- Silver coin of Ebrahim Shah, minted at Qazvin in 1748/1749

Shah of Iran
- Reign: 8 December 1748 – after June/July 1749
- Predecessor: Shahrokh Shah
- Successor: Shahrokh Shah
- Born: c. 1725
- Died: after June/July 1749 (aged 24 or 25)
- Dynasty: Afsharid
- Father: Ebrahim Khan Afshar
- Religion: Twelver Shia Islam

Ebrahim Shah (Persian: ابراهیم‌شاه; c. 1725 – after June/July 1749) was the Afsharid shah of parts of Iran from 1748 to 1749.

Born Mohammad-Ali c. 1725, he was the second son of Ebrahim Khan Afshar, the younger brother of the first Afsharid ruler Nader Shah (r. 1736–1747). In 1739, Mohammad-Ali adopted the name "Ebrahim Beg" following the death of his father during an expedition. In the 1740s, while serving as the sardar (military commander) of the Azerbaijan province, Ebrahim led a victorious campaign at Ardabil against Sam Mirza, a claimant to the Safavid throne. In 1747, Nader Shah was assassinated and succeeded by Ebrahim's elder brother Adel Shah.

Preferring to revel in Mashhad, Adel Shah appointed Ebrahim as the governor of Isfahan and its surroundings. Soon thereafter, Ebrahim declared independence and joined forces with his cousin Amir Aslan Khan Afshar, the governor of Azerbaijan. Adel Shah eventually marched against his brother, but many of his men deserted, and consequently he was defeated (in June 1748) and fled to the town of Tehran. There he was captured and blinded by its governor, Mirza Mohsen Khan, who then gave him over to Mir Sayyed Mohammad. The latter took Adel Shah back to Mashhad, where a group of Turkic, Kurdish, and Arab tribal leaders had taken advantage of his absence and declared Shahrokh the new shah on 1 October. Adel Shah was executed at the request of Shahrokh and the mother of Nasrollah Mirza.

They summoned Ebrahim to acknowledge Shahrokh in person, but he declined. Pretending to have rebelled in support of Shahrokh, Ebrahim instead invited him to be crowned in Isfahan. The nobles of Khorasan, however, deciphered his true intentions and requested Ebrahim to appear at Mashhad as a token of goodwill. Seeing no further progress in the negotiations, Ebrahim revealed his real agenda and went to the city of Tabriz in Azerbaijan, where he was crowned shah on 8 December 1748. Following the counsel of the tribal leaders, Shahrokh assigned Musa Khan Afshar Taromi with the task to defeat Ebrahim Shah. A battle soon followed in June or July 1749 in the environs of Semnan, where Ebrahim Shah was forced to withdraw as a result of turmoil amongst his troops. Some of his Afghan and Uzbek troops deserted to Shahrokh, while others fled. Ebrahim Shah fled to the fortress of Qal'a-ye Qalapur, but was soon captured and given to Musa Khan Afshar Taromi, who had him blinded. He was then sent to Mashhad, but died en route.

== Sources ==
- Barati, András (2019). "The Succession Struggle Following the Death of Nādir Shāh (1747–1750)". Orpheus Noster 11/4: 44–58.
- Nejatie, Sajjad (2017). "Iranian Migrations in the Durrani Empire". Comparative Studies of South Asia, Africa and the Middle East. 37. Project Muse: 494–509. doi:10.1215/1089201x-4279212. S2CID 148940975.
- Perry, John. R. (1984). "Afsharids". Encyclopædia Iranica, Vol. I, online edition, Fasc. 6. New York. pp. 587–589.
- Perry, John. R. (1991). "The Zand dynasty". In Avery, Peter; Hambly, Gavin R. G.; Melville, Charles Peter (eds.). The Cambridge History of Iran: From Nadir Shah to the Islamic Republic. Vol. 7. Cambridge: Cambridge University Press. pp. 63–104. ISBN 0-521-20095-4.
- Perry, John. R. (1997). "Ebrāhīm Shah Afšār". Encyclopædia Iranica, Vol. VIII, online edition, Fasc. 1. New York. pp. 75–76.

Ebrahim Afshar Afsharid dynasty Born: c. 1725 Died: after June/July 1749
Iranian royalty
Preceded by Shahrokh Shah	Shah of Iran; 8 December 1748 – after June/July 1749	Succeeded by Shahrokh Shah
