= Mohammad Zaman Khan =

Mohammad Zaman Khan Sadozai
- Sultan of Herat; Chief of the Abdalis

Sultan of Herat
- Reign: 1718 – 1721
- Predecessor: Asadullah Khan
- Successor: Mohammad Khan
- Born: 1668; Herat or Kandahar, Safavid Iran
- Died: June 1721 (aged 52–53); Herat, Sadozai Sultanate of Herat
- Spouse: Zarghona Anaa
- Issue: Zulfiqar Khan; Ahmad Khan
- Father: Dawlat Khan
- Religion: Sunni Islam

Mohammad Zaman Khan Abdali (Note: Pashto: محمد زمان خان ابدالي, romanized: Muhammad Zamān Xān Abdāli [mu.wa.mad̪ za.mɑn xɑn ʔab.d̪ɑ.li, mu.ham.mad̪ za.mɑn xɑn ab.d̪ɑ.li]; Dari: محمد زمان خان ابدالی, romanized: Mohammad Zamān Khān Abdālī [mʊ.wäm.mád̪ zä.mɑ́ːn xɑːn ʔäb.d̪ɑ́ː.líː, mo̞.ɦäm.mád̪ zä.mɑ́ːn xɑːn ʔäb.d̪ɑ́ː.líː]) was the chief of the Abdali tribal confederacy that ruled the Sadozai Sultanate of Herat in the early 18th century and was born in 1668. He played a key role in the final years of Safavid control in Khorasan and was among the earliest Abdali leaders to exercise independent authority in the region.

== Early life ==
Zaman Khan was born to Dawlat Khan, of the Sarmast Khel Popalzai tribe of Pashtuns. He was the younger brother of Rustam Khan, and related to later Durrani rulers through his son Zulfiqar Khan and Ahmad Shah Durrani. His family held influence among the Alakozai tribe and other Abdali clans based around Herat and Kandahar.

== Rise to power ==
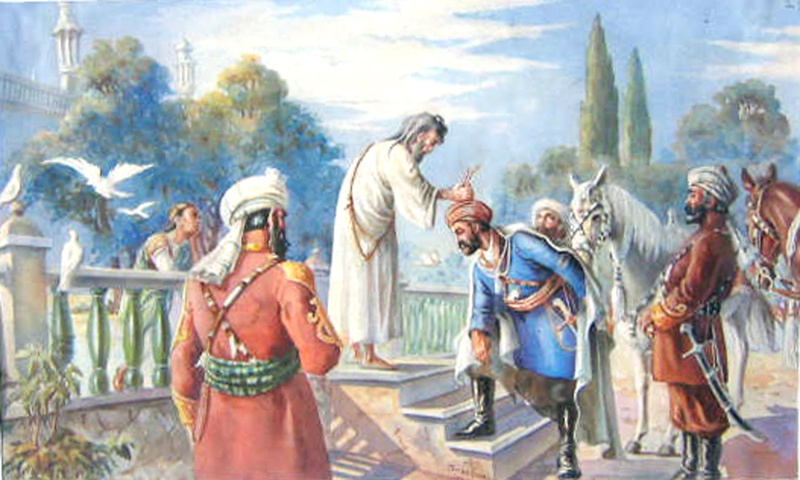
Coronation of Ahmad Shah Durrani, the son of Mohammad Zaman Khan

In 1718, Abdali tribesmen gathered at Herat to elect a new leader. Zaman Khan, supported by the Alakozai tribe, was chosen as chief, and imprisoned Abdullah Khan, a rival elder, who died in captivity. This marked Zaman Khan’s full control over Herat and its surrounding territories.

== Battle of Kafir Qala ==
In 1719, the Safavid commander Sufi Quli Khan Turkistan-Ughli advanced toward Herat with a large army from Mashhad. Zaman Khan led the Abdali forces against him at Kafir Qala, where the Safavid army was defeated and its commander killed on 19 May 1719, thus saving the city of Herat from doom.

== Governance ==
Following his victory, Zaman Khan issued an administrative decree in the summer of 1719, which ordered his official, Yahya Khan, to lead a contingent against a local rebel named Qasim Baluch, who had harassed the people of Tabas and Qa’in. The document emphasized justice and security, quoting the maxim “Kingship can endure with unbelief but not with tyranny.” The decree represents one of the earliest surviving records of Abdali rule in Herat and an effort to legitimize local authority after the decline of Safavid power.

== Death and succession ==
Zaman Khan ruled Herat for about two and a half years before being overthrown and killed in June 1721 during internal Abdali conflicts. Some accounts attribute his death to the sons of Abdullah Khan, possibly Mohammad Khan or Allahyar Khan. He was succeeded briefly by Muhammad Khan and later by his own son, Zulfiqar Khan, who ruled until 1724.
