= Peter Avery =

British scholar of Persian (1923–2008)

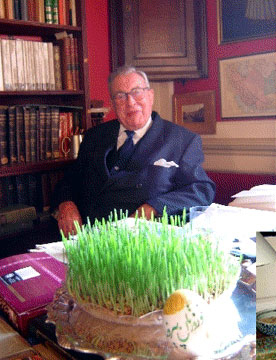
Peter Avery in his office in the King's College, Cambridge posing in front of the Persian history and literature. New Year table of Haft-Seen By: Ali Akbar Abdolrashidi

Peter William Avery OBE (15 May 1923 – 6 October 2008) was an eminent British scholar of Persian and a Fellow of King's College, Cambridge.

== Career ==
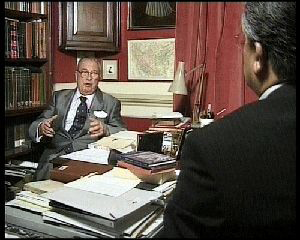
Peter Avery in a TV interview with the Iranian journalist, Ali Akbar Abdolrashidi

Avery contributed to English language work on Persian history and literature, such as The Age of Expansion and Medieval Persia and published Modern Iran. One of Avery's best known works is a translation (with poet John Heath-Stubbs) of the Persian text of Rubaiyat of Omar Khayyam, first published in 1979. Also with John Heath-Stubbs, Avery published "Thirty Poems of Hafiz of Shiraz", reprinted in 2006. His final work, and the culmination of his career, was a translation of the complete lyrics of Hafiz, The Collected Lyrics of Hafiz of Shiraz, published in 2007, which was awarded the Farabi prize and is currently the only contemporary complete translation in English. His translations are published with copious notes explaining allusions in the text and filling in what the poets would have expected their readers to know.

== Life ==
Avery was born in Derby and educated at Rock Ferry High School, Birkenhead and Liverpool University. War Service in the Royal Navy interrupted his studies, which he resumed after the war at the London School of Oriental and African Studies, graduating in 1949. He learned Arabic and Persian and knowledge of these led to his appointment as chief language training officer with the Anglo-Iranian Oil Company in Abadan, South-West Iran. In 1951 the government of Iran nationalised the oil industry and Avery moved to Baghdad, where he taught English. In 1952, he published, with John Heath-Stubbs his first translations of Hafiz. In 1958 he was appointed Lecturer in Persian Language Literature and History at Cambridge University, becoming a Fellow of King's College in 1964. He retired from the Lectureship in 1990, but continued researching and writing as a Fellow of King's, and continued to lead an informal reading group in Persian poetry, despite ill health, until his last months.

== Selected works ==
- Modern Iran, Praeger, 1965.
- The Cambridge History of Iran, edited by P. Avery, G. R. G. Hambly and C. Melville, Cambridge University Press (1991) ISBN 0-521-20095-4.
- Peter Avery, The Collected Lyrics of Hafiz of Shiraz, 603 p. (Archetype, Cambridge, UK, 2007). ISBN 1-901383-26-1 hb; ISBN 1-901383-09-1 pb
  Note: This translation is based on Divān-e Hāfez, Volume 1, The Lyrics (Ghazals), edited by Parviz Natel-Khanlari (Tehran, Iran, 1362 AH/1983-4).
- Peter Avery, The Speech of the Birds, Mantiqu't-Tair, of Faridu'd-Din 'Attar / Farid ad-Din Attar, 560 p. (The Islamic Texts Society, Cambridge, UK, 1998). ISBN 0-946621-69-1 (cloth), 0-946621-70-5 (paper).

== Awards ==
- OBE, received in 2001.
- Iran's Farabi Prize, received in 2008.

== See also ==
- Iranian Studies
