= Herat campaign of 1730–1732 =

Nader Shah's conquest of Herat

Herat Rebellion
- Part of Naderian Wars
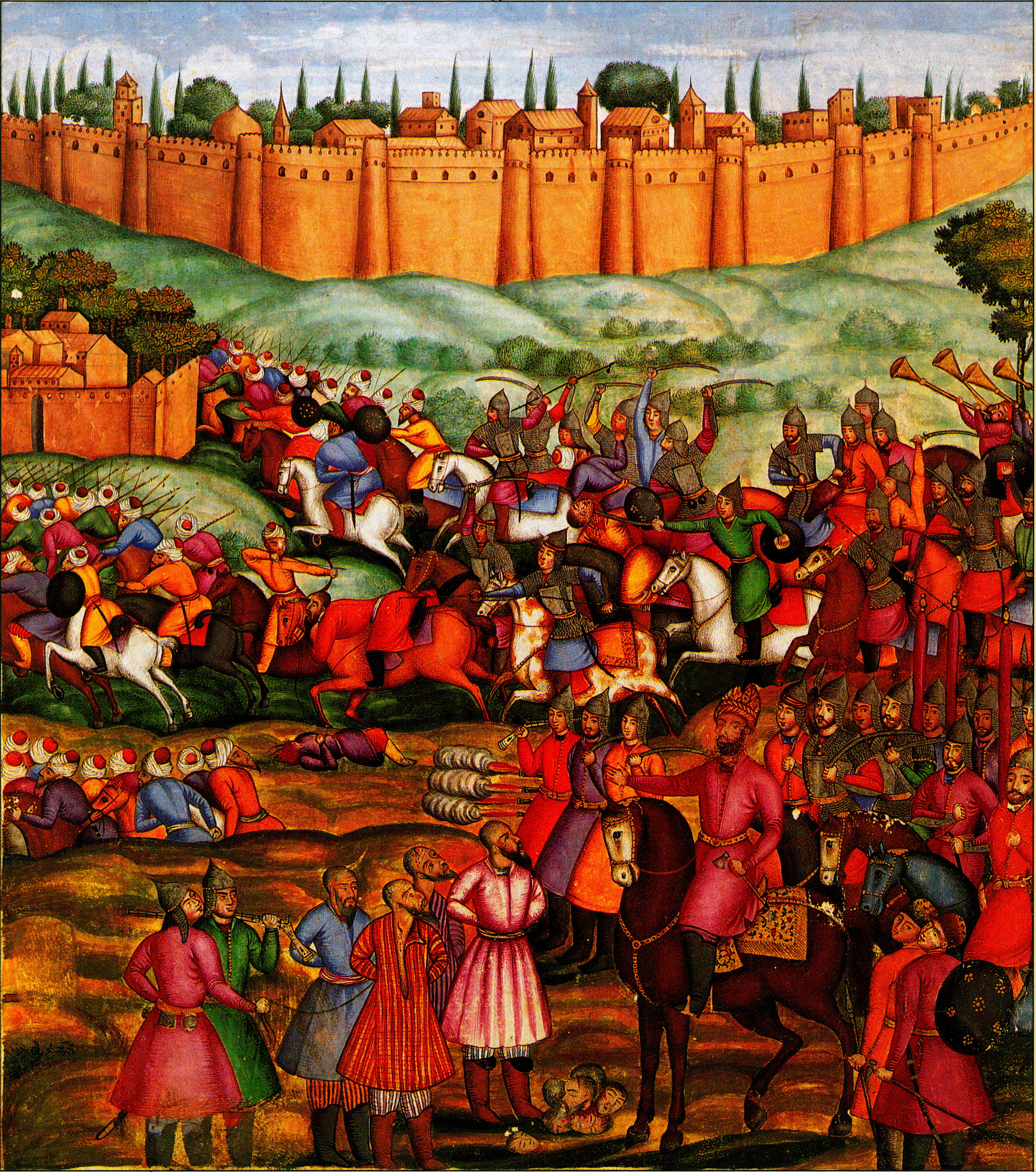
Date	August 1730 – February 1732
Location	Khorasan
Result	Safavid victory: Fall of the Sadozai Sultanate of Herat
Territorial changes	Herat brought under Persian suzerainty once again

Belligerents
Safavid Iran; Afghan loyalists	Sadozai Sultanate of Herat; Hotak dynasty

Commanders and leaders
Nader; Ebrahim Khan Afshar; Allahyar Khan	Zulfaqar Khan; Mohammad Seidal Khan; Allahyar Khan (after September 1731)

Strength
Unknown	Unknown

Casualties and losses
500,000 killed	

The Herat Campaign of 1730–1732 (Persian: لشکرکشی هرات) took place when Nader Shah who had already successfully driven the Ottomans from western Iran and southern Azerbaijan had to cut his campaign short to deal with the revolt of the Abdalis of Herat who were provoked into bearing arms against their Persian overlords by Hussein Hotaki of Qandahar. The conflict resulted in the re-establishment of Persian rule over Herat.

== Zulfaqar Khan's Revolt ==
As the Persian empire set about re-incorporating the lost territories to the west, Hussein sultan of Qandahar intrigued the Abdalis of Herat to raise against their masters while the main Persian forces were arrayed against the Ottomans 1,500 kilometres to the west. The governor of Herat, Allahyar Khan, who was confirmed in his position by Nader after the war in 1729 remained loyal but his chief lieutenant Zulfaqar Khan was very much taken by Qandahar's assurances and support. The Abdali who supported the Ghilzai requested Zulfaqar Khan expel Allah Yar Khan from Mashhad. In January, Zulfaqar Khan revolted from Farah. After a 3-month conflict, Zulfaqar Khan entered Herat on 21 April 1730 and Allahyar Khan fled the city. He was given refuge by Nader's brother, Ebrahim Khan Afshar.

== Second Herat Campaign ==
The Abdalis invaded Khorasan itself in July and marched on its capital, Mashad, with 8,000 soldiers. They defeated the Persian army under Ebrahim Khan, forcing it to withdraw into the city walls which now came under siege. Although the Abdalis had little chance of actually taking the city as what little artillery they possessed would make hardly any impression on the battlements of Mashad, these events shook Nader who received word that his power base back in Khorasan was under threat.

In addition to besieging Mashhad, Dutch East India Company reports also indicate that during the summer of 1730 the Abdalis also threatened Kerman and by September had briefly besieged the city. On 16 August Nader left Tabriz and marched his forces across 2,250 kilometres over the Iranian plateau with lightning speed, bringing him to Mashad where he found the Abdalis in headlong retreat.

== Siege of Herat ==
Hussein Hotaki was growing increasingly anxious about his position in Qandahar with Nader approaching Herat, prompting him to enter into negotiations with Nader in which he sent back a few captive Safavid princesses. Hussein sultan's support for his proxy, Zulfaqar Khan, however did not cease or even lessen - in fact a Ghilzai force of at least a few thousand strong commanded by Mohammad Seidal Khan was sent from Qandahar to support him. In February 1731, Nader ordered Emamverdi Khan, the Governor of Kerman, to march to Herat and subdue the Abdalis.

The Persian army arrived during April 1731 in the town of Nuqra, a few kilometres from Herat itself, whence they fanned out and to take hold of the towers and strongholds in Herat's environs. During one of these nights Nader's small entourage of a mere eight musketeers were trapped in an isolated tower when Seidal Khan carried out a surprise raid. Fortunately for Nader a unit of musketeers happened upon the Afghan cavalry encircling his tower and put the enemy to flight. At a later date after crossing over a bridge over Harrirud, the Persians beat back a large counterattack by the Afghans forcing them to retire behind the walls of Herat's citadel. On a particular night when Nader was resting in his tent, an Afghan cannon from the citadel walls fired a random shot, lobbing a round ball through the roof of the tent with it landing right next to Nader's bed as he was resting causing his followers to claim he had divine protection.

The final decisive engagement took place outside the city when Zulfaqar Khan and Seidal Khan agreed to a joint coordinated attack against the Persians. The attack was decimated when Nader sent a flanking force round the Afghans and himself rode directly against their front with a large body of cavalry. The defeat caused Seidal Khan's departure which in turn led to the remaining defenders of Herat asking for terms of submission.

== Allahyar Khan's Betrayal ==
Under the treaty signed by both sides Allahyar Khan was returned his governorship of Herat with Zulfaqar Khan being exiled to Farah. Nader did not however militarily occupy the citadel - an action which would prove a terrible mistake when 4,000 fighters came down from Farah and stoked the fires of rebellion once more. Allahyar Khan was pressured despite his reluctance to join the revolt. Allahyar Khan was also exiled.

The siege of the citadel was hence resumed with the Afghans sending peace emissaries once they realised their predicament. The negotiations lasted a long while but were eventually concluded, giving Zulfaqar Khan and his brother a chance to escape to Qandahar whilst Herat came under occupation but was surprisingly not looted or sacked by Nader's troops. Ebrahim Khan managed to conquer Farah, helping to pacify the region as a whole in addition to Nader's policies of forced migration for many of the tribes involved in the rebellion as well as incorporating many of their fighters into his own armed forces.

== See also ==
- Military of Afsharid Iran
- Sadozai Sultanate of Herat
- Naderian Wars
- Nader Shah
- Safavid Restoration
- Ottoman-Persian War (1730-1735)
