= Sadozai Sultanate of Herat =

18th-century state in Afghanistan

Sadozai Sultanate of Herat (1690–1732) د هرات سدوزی سلطنت
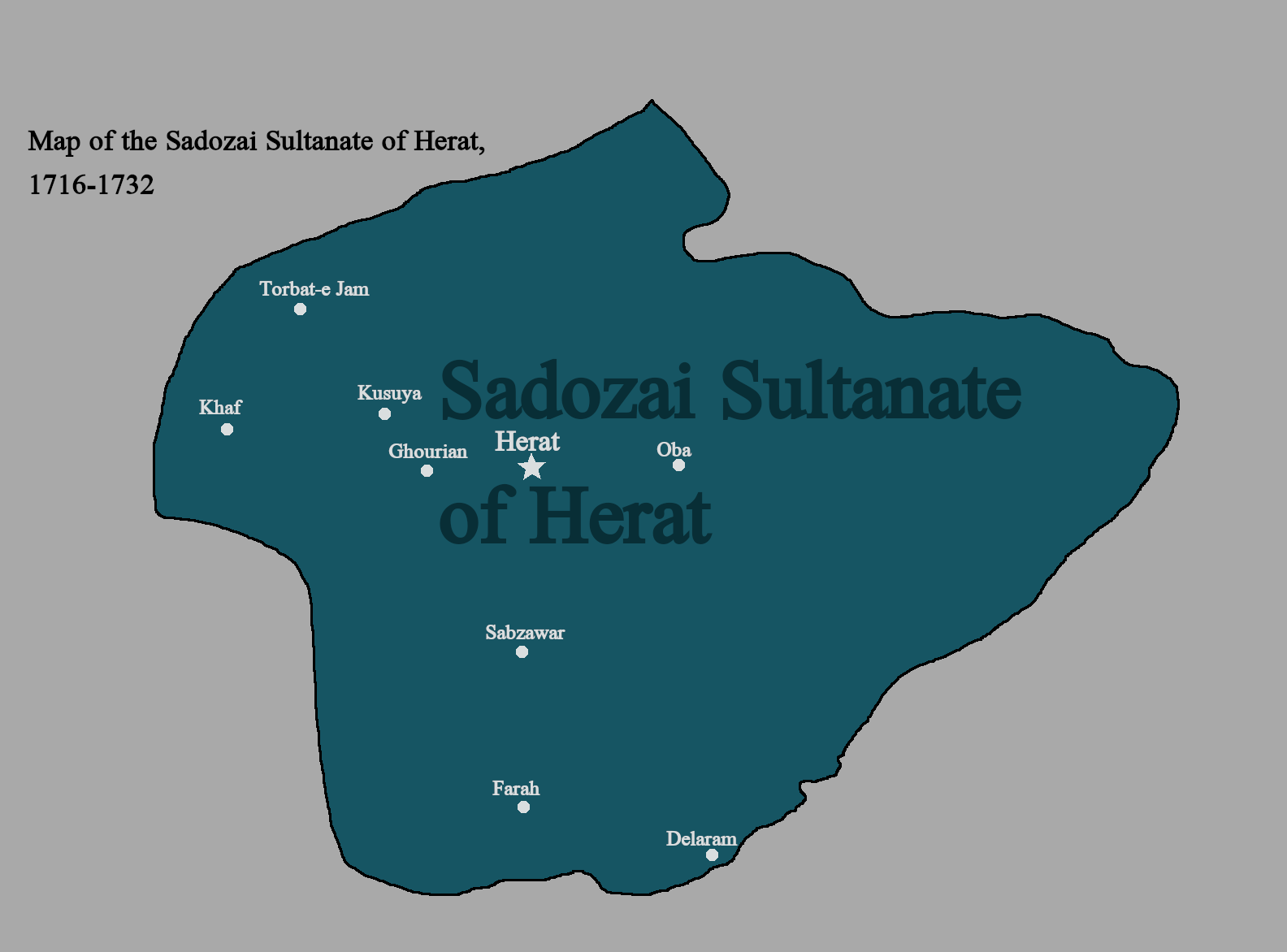
- Map of the Sadozai Sultanate of Herat
- Capital and largest city: Herat
- Official languages: Pashto
- Sultan
  - 1716–1718 (first): Abd Allah Khan
  - 1725–1731 (last): Zulfiqar Khan
Preceded by	Succeeded by
Safavid Herat	Afsharid Iran
- Today part of: Afghanistan; Iran; Turkmenistan

The Sadozai Sultanate of Herat (Pashto: د هرات سدوزی سلطنت) was a state in Herat, established in 1716 when Abdali Afghans under the Hotak Empire, led by their chiefs Asad Allāh Khan and Zaman Khan, conquered the area and expelled Safavid forces from the region. The area was retaken in 1732 by the Safavids.

Although based in Herat, the Sadozai rulers maintained strong links with their kins in Multan, and were influenced by the Mughal court culture.

== List of the sultans of Herat ==
Seven Sadozai sultans ruled in Herat:

1717–1721: Abd Allah Khan

1721: Mohammad Zaman Khan

1721–1722: Shah Qasim Khan

1722: Muqarrab Khan, brother of Abd Allah Khan

1722–1724: Shah Muhammad Khan, son of Abd Allah Khan

1725–1731: Zulfiqar Khan, son of Muhammad Zaman Khan

1725–1732: Allah Yar Khan, son of Abd Allah Khan
