= Michael Axworthy =

English academic and writer (1962–2019)

Michael George Andrew Axworthy (26 September 1962 – 16 March 2019) was an English academic, author, and commentator. He was the head of the Iran section at the British Foreign & Commonwealth Office between 1998 and 2000.

== Personal life and family ==
Michael Axworthy was born in Woking on 26 September 1962. He spent his childhood in West Kirby, Radyr, Ilkley and Chester, where he attended The King's School.

Axworthy visited Iran frequently during holidays as a teenager because his father, Ifor, was involved in a project there with the Midland Bank. He recalled leaving the capital, Tehran, around September 1978 soon after the first large demonstrations against the soon-to-be-deposed Shah of Iran, Mohammad Reza Pahlavi, had taken place in the city.

While studying history at Peterhouse, Cambridge, in the 1980s, Axworthy was greatly influenced by historians and other academics with interests in the history of ideas, such as Tim Blanning, Maurice Cowling, and Martin Golding. He graduated with a BA degree in 1985 and was awarded an MA in 2002.

He lived with his wife, Sally (née Hinds), whom he married in 1996, at Morwenstow, Cornwall. He died of cancer at his house in Rome on 16 March 2019 and was survived by his son and three daughters.

== Career ==
An inability to get a grant to study for a Ph.D. led Axworthy to apply for work at the Foreign and Commonwealth Office (FCO), a department of the UK government where he thought he would be able to indulge in his desire for a challenging job that involved living abroad. He stayed with the FCO until 2005, and was its Head of Iran Section in Tehran between 1998 and 2000 after spells working in Germany and Malta.

Axworthy took leave from the FCO in 2000 and in 2005 he resigned his position. He later said:

I thought that the FCO would be challenging, and I liked the idea of living abroad. I was right about that — but the FCO also taught me how to write, which was a bonus. But ultimately I wanted to write books, and I was never entirely at ease in a large, hierarchical organisation.

Axworthy became a Research Fellow at the Centre for Middle Eastern and Islamic Studies, University of Durham, in December 2001. From 2005, he taught Middle East history at Exeter University. He was appointed director of the university's newly established Centre for Persian and Iranian Studies in 2008 and since 2012, when he was awarded a Ph.D., was a senior lecturer in the university's Institute of Arab and Islamic Studies. He acknowledged the irony that the bureaucracy he tried to escape by leaving the FCO had now resurfaced in his academic life. He was a critic of the target-led UK higher education system – "Everybody is hyper-incentivised to pursue research grant applications and so on when everybody knows, including the Treasury and research councils, that presumably 90 per cent of that effort is completely wasted" – but accepted that there is probably no perfect solution.

Axworthy was refused entry to Iran in his later years, during the presidency of Mahmoud Ahmadinejad. He was uncertain of the reasons for this, having been variously told that it was because of general relationship issues involving Iran and the UK and that it was due to the content of his own writings. On one occasion, in 2008, he and his family were all refused a visa at a time when his wife was due to take up the post of deputy head of mission for the FCO in Tehran; on another, in 2012, he was eventually granted a visa but was turned back at the border.

== Writings, broadcasts and consultancy ==
In 2006, Axworthy took part in The Doha Debates, successfully arguing against the motion that "This House believes that Iran poses the greatest threat to security in the region." His first book, The Sword of Persia: Nader Shah, from Tribal Warrior to Conquering Tyrant, was published in the same year and his second, Empire of the Mind: A History of Iran, was published in the following year.

2013 saw publication of Axworthy's book titled Revolutionary Iran: A History of the Islamic Republic, which was described by James Buchan as a "calm and literary portrait". A review by Ervand Abrahamian raised several criticisms, including Axworthy's subscription to what he, Abrahamian, believes to be a "royal myth", and that the book deals better with contemporary events than it does with history. Nonetheless, Abrahamian says "If you were to read only one book on present-day Iran you could not do better than this."

Axworthy wrote articles for academic journals and for publications such as The Guardian, Prospect and The Independent, and appeared on broadcast programmes such as Start the Week, Sky News, Today and A History of the World in 100 Objects, as well as on the Peterhouse team in the 2018 Christmas series of University Challenge. He was also an editor.

Other work undertaken by Axworthy included consultancy for organisations such as Credit Suisse and Citibank. He also worked with the governments of the Netherlands, Norway, UK and United States, as well as NATO, for all of whom he gave briefings and other speaking engagements.

== Recognition ==
Axworthy was a Fellow both of the Royal Asiatic Society (2007) and the Royal Society of Arts. He was elected to the governing council of the British Institute of Persian Studies in 2017.

== Bibliography ==
- The Sword of Persia: Nader Shah, from Tribal Warrior to Conquering Tyrant. I. B. Tauris. 2006.
- Empire of the Mind: A History of Iran. Hurst Books. 2007., republished as a Penguin paperback: Iran: Empire of the Mind: A History from Zoroaster to the Present Day. Penguin. 2008. ISBN 978-0-14-103629-8.
- Revolutionary Iran: A History of the Islamic Republic. Oxford University Press. 2013. ISBN 978-0-19932-226-8.
- Iran: What everyone needs to know. 2017.
- Towards a Westphalia for the Middle East [with Patrick Milton and Brendan Simms] (Hurst, 2018)
- Crisis, Collapse, Militarism and Civil War: The History and Historiography of 18th-century Iran. 2018. (editor)
