= Capture of Julfa =

1722 Afghan capture of the Armenian suburb of Isfahan

- Part of Afghan Rebellions of 1709–1726
Date	16–17 March 1722 (Note: Krusinski states that the Afghans occupied Farahabad on 19 March 1722 and took Julfa the next day, and that Julfa was easier to attack Isfahan from. Roemer also places the occupation of Farahabad before the plundering of Julfa.)
Location	Julfa, Iran
Result	Hotaki victory

Belligerents
Hotak dynasty	Armenian Loyalists

Commanders and leaders
Mahmud Hotak; Nasrullah	Unknown

Strength
7,000	Several hundred armed townsmen

Casualties and losses
Light	Heavy; 50 Captured

The Capture of Julfa took place on the night of 16–17 March 1722, during the Siege of Isfahan by forces of Mahmud Hotak. Following his victory at the Battle of Gulnabad, Mahmud concentrated his men against the Armenian suburb of Isfahan, Julfa.

== Background ==
Relations between the Armenians of Julfa and the Persian authorities were already poor. The Polish Jesuit Judasz Tadeusz Krusinski, who lived in Isfahan at the time, gave examples of Persian violence against Armenians that went unpunished, and stated that the court feared the Armenians would join the Afghans as soon as they appeared.

Disarming them openly so close to the Afghan army was thought too dangerous. Instead it was proclaimed in Julfa that the Armenians should come to Isfahan with their weapons in as large a body as possible, because the king wanted to place them near his person. When they arrived they were drawn up in ranks as if for a muster, told to lay down their arms and go home, and warned that anyone later found with arms would be heavily fined. As the Afghans approached, the Armenians asked the court for troops and offered to pay for their upkeep themselves. The Persian general promised help. None came.

== Capture ==
Despite being deprived of most of their arms by the Persian authorities, the Armenian townspeople mounted a determined resistance. They attempted to deceive the Afghans by calling each other Persian names to create the impression of a Persian garrison. However, after hours of fighting, Julfa fell to Mahmud's forces.

Krusinski put the main attack at two hours, at night. The defenders were waiting for the promised relief before making a sortie, and when it failed to arrive they gave up a small entrenchment that had been thrown up in haste. Later the same night a Gabr serving with the Afghans opened a hole in the wall. An elephant was brought up to it and pulled down a good part of the wall. Nasrullah, who led the attack, took the breach but went no further in the dark. He posted a guard and waited for daylight. The leading citizens then went to the Afghan camp to ask for terms.

== Ransom and plunder ==
After the capture, the Afghans ransacked houses and imposed an indemnity of 70,000 tomans. About fifty Armenian girls were seized, some retained by Mahmud himself and the rest distributed among Afghan officers. The Armenian population suffered heavily under this occupation, though some captives were later released.

Krusinski's account of the terms is close to Lockhart's. Julfa surrendered at discretion and was to buy off the lives and goods of its people for 70,000 tomans, which he reckoned at about 400,000 pounds, and to hand over fifty girls from the best Armenian families. The girls were chosen by lot and taken to the Afghan camp at Farahabad with their clothes and jewels. Some died of grief soon after they arrived. The Afghans sent back those who seemed in danger and returned the rest to their parents once Isfahan had fallen.

The Armenians claimed their wealth was in Isfahan. The Afghans had the chief citizens sign a bond for the 70,000 tomans, payable when the capital fell or a peace was made. They then announced that every house would be searched, with an account kept and the takings set against the debt. Krusinski called the search a pillage in all but name. There was no killing, but owners were dragged out and beaten on the soles of their feet until they revealed what they, and their neighbours, had hidden. One old man, Dominique Jaques Kardelans, took more than 4,000 strokes and for a time lost the power of speech without naming anyone. The Afghans found 60,000 pounds in coin in the houses of the Kardelans brothers and about 40,000 in that of Arat Cheriman, one of the richest merchants in Julfa. Krusinski believed the plunder came to more than the ransom.

The historian H. R. Roemer, writing in the Cambridge History of Iran, states that Julfa owed its defence to its own inhabitants and not to Persian soldiers, and that the tribute was exacted without mercy. The Swedish traveller Jean Otter gave a different picture in 1748, writing that Mahmud took Julfa without meeting much resistance.

== Aftermath ==
The fall of Julfa was immediately followed by the abandonment of nearby Farahābād, which Mahmud occupied without resistance and made his headquarters. Contemporary observers suggested that possession of Farahābād was crucial, since it provided Mahmud with a secure base for the ensuing Siege of Isfahan.

In Isfahan the Armenians were blamed for the loss and accused of having let the Afghans in. Krusinski called the charge unjust. The court had taken their arms and sent them no help. When Safi Mirza, the shah's eldest son, was riding toward Julfa at the head of a large body of cavalry, the Persian general took hold of his horse's bridle and told him the king would not let him expose himself. Krusinski wrote that it was always believed the court had sacrificed Julfa to save the capital, in the hope that the Afghans would go home once they were loaded with booty. He counted two great faults in the defence: giving up Farahabad, and failing to hold Julfa, which could have kept the bridge open and supplies flowing into Isfahan.
