= Siege of Shiraz =

1723-1724 Siege against Safavid

- Part of Afghan Rebellions of 1709–1726
| Date | July 28 1723 – April 14 1724 |
| Location | Shiraz, Fars Province, Safavid Iran |
| Result | Hotaki victory |

Belligerents
| Hotaki Empire | Safavid Empire |

Commanders and leaders
| Mahmud Hotak; Nasrullah Khan †; Zabardast Khan hazara | Safavid Governor of Shiraz (surrendered); Hagi-Bakir † (Note: Lockhart describes a Hajji Baqer, the Arab chief of Qomisheh, who was subdued by the Afghans on their way south (see above). Krusinski does not say where his Hagi-Bakir came from, and the two accounts do not make clear whether they were the same man.) |

Strength
| Afghans and 6,000 Dargazins | |

Casualties and losses
| 2,000 killed, not counting the Dargazins (Krusinski) | About 2,000 of the garrison killed (Krusinski); About 20,000 dead of famine (Krusinski); 100,000 killed (other estimates) |

The Siege of Shiraz was a major engagement during the Hotak invasion of Persia, in which forces loyal to Mahmud Hotak besieged the Safavid stronghold of Shiraz in Fars Province. Beginning with the death in battle of the Afghan commander Nasrullah, the siege dragged on for nine months (Note: Krusinski gave the length of the siege as ten months. The dates given by Floor, 28 July 1723 to 14 April 1724, come to a little under nine months.) before famine compelled the city to surrender. Although exaggerated figures claim that over 100,000 people perished, (Note: Krusinski put the deaths from famine at about 20,000.) the siege remains one of the bloodiest episodes of the Afghan occupation of Iran.

== Background ==
By mid-1723, Mahmud Hotak had consolidated his hold over much of central Persia. When the town of Qumisha surrendered to Zabardast Khan in July 1723, he gained full control of the country around his capital Isfahan.

At the same time, Mahmud dispatched his general Nasrullah, with 3,000 men to collect provisions in the north-west. Save for a repulse at Hamadan, Nasrullah met little resistance and returned with large stores of food. He also resettled some 4,000 Sunni Dargazin families in Isfahan, as Mahmud sought to replace the unreliable local population with elements more loyal to the Hotak regime. Families of Afghan officers were also brought from Kandahar to prevent desertion, including Mahmud’s own mother, whose ragged state upon arrival in Isfahan shocked contemporary observers.

With Isfahan relatively secure, Mahmud turned southward. His emissaries to Shiraz were insulted and dismissed, and he therefore resolved to bring Fars into obedience by force. Nasrullah was ordered to march on Shiraz in July 1723, supported by both Afghan troops and the transplanted Dargazins. On July 7, 1723, The Hotaki force moved out of Isfahan to besiege Shiraz. They first subdued Hajji Baqer, the Arab warlord that controlled the district of Qomisheh.

The Polish Jesuit Judasz Tadeusz Krusinski, who lived in Isfahan through the Afghan occupation, wrote the fullest contemporary account of the siege. His memoirs were arranged and published by Jean-Antoine du Cerceau, and appeared in English in 1728 and 1740. According to Krusinski, Shiraz was twelve days' march from Isfahan. Nasrullah set out with his Afghans and the 6,000 Dargazins who had enlisted under him, and several towns on his road sent him their keys.

== Siege ==
The Hotakis besieged Shiraz by July 28. Nasrullah advanced without opposition until he reached Shiraz, where the governor rejected his summons to surrender. Leading the assault in person, Nasrullah was among the first to fall. His unexpected death, despite his reputation for invulnerability, was a severe blow to Afghan morale and authority. The Safavid defenders took courage from this loss, while surrounding towns and villages that had submitted to Nasrullah quickly revolted, exposing the fragility of Afghan rule. Despite this setback, Mahmud dispatched Zabardast Khan to take command and renew the siege. The defenders of Shiraz resisted strongly, and the city might have held indefinitely had its governor prepared adequate food supplies before the Afghan advance. Instead, famine gradually eroded the city’s strength.

=== Death of Nasrullah ===
Krusinski stated that Nasrullah was killed by a musket ball in the first assault. His army gave him a funeral that Krusinski found barbarous and believed the Afghans had learned from the Indians. The troops marched round the body with their colours trailing on the ground. Slaves and Persian prisoners were then made to do the same, and their throats were cut at his feet. His finest horses were killed and the meat divided among the soldiers for a funeral feast.

Krusinski described him as tall and badly built. The Afghans called him Kior-Sultan, the "Blind Lord", because he kept one eye shut. Before the Kandahar wars he had robbed caravans, sometimes raiding as far as Isfahan. In Perie, three days from Isfahan, he had pressed the Georgians whom Shah Abbas settled there to return to Christianity and sent to Isfahan for a Georgian priest; Krusinski put this down to his hatred of the Shia rather than any liking for Christians. He was known as a protector of the Armenians. Mahmud had a monument built for him near the Armenian churchyard and paid two priests to pray at the tomb and keep a fire burning there, "he being of the Religion of the Gaures, who worship Fire". Because Nasrullah had never been beaten, he was suspected of sorcery. The Afghans still visited his tomb and honoured him as a saint. Zabardast Khan, who had just reduced the districts around the capital, was chosen over the other Afghan officers to succeed him.

=== Hagi-Bakir and the blockade ===
The governor of Shiraz had fortified the city with care but had not stocked it with food. Krusinski wrote that he trusted less in his garrison than in an old Arab officer named Hagi-Bakir, whom he paid a large sum to defend the city, with the promise of a larger one if the siege was raised. Hagi-Bakir held the real command. The townspeople had worn the besiegers down with frequent sorties, to the point where the Afghans despaired of continuing. Hagi-Bakir stopped them and kept the population shut up inside the walls.

As food ran short, people escaped by back roads. The Afghans were glad to see the city empty and let them through, sometimes for a price. Hagi-Bakir finally rode out at the head of 6,000 men to bring in a supply convoy. On the way back a body of 800 Afghans cut off his retreat and killed him along with 200 of his men. The convoy fell to the besiegers. Krusinski thought this decided the siege, because the Afghan camp was hungrier than the city and would otherwise have had to withdraw.

=== Fall of the city ===
By Krusinski's count about 20,000 people had died of hunger when the governor sent his brother to the Afghan camp to treat. The Afghans held the envoy and stormed the city while the talks were under way. The defenders, expecting a capitulation, had left their posts. The Afghans killed everyone they could reach until their officers stopped the slaughter. The city was then plundered. In one private house the soldiers found more grain than would have fed the garrison for three months. They tied the owner to a stake in the middle of his granary and left him there to starve. Krusinski put the losses at 2,000 Afghans, not counting the Dargazins, and as many from the garrison. Nearly all fell at the start, in the first attack and the early sorties. The final storm was the only assault the Afghans made.

Jean Otter, who travelled in Persia in the late 1730s, gave a shorter version. He stated that Zabardast Khan kept up the siege after Nasrullah was shot, and that the governor, out of food, was about to capitulate when the Afghans attacked, broke in and killed part of the population.

After nine months, Shiraz capitulated in mid-1724. On April 14, 1724, Shiraz fell.

== Aftermath ==
Following its fall, Shiraz was sacked. Contemporary accounts suggested that as many as 100,000 inhabitants had perished during the famine. Nasrullah’s death was widely mourned by Armenians and Zoroastrians, who regarded him as a tolerant protector, and even by some Persians, who found his rule humane compared to other Afghan commanders. His loss deprived Mahmud Hotak of one of his most capable generals. The fall of Shiraz extended Afghan authority over Fars, but it also underscored the dependence of Hotak power on sheer coercion. Resistance continued in other provinces, and Mahmud’s position remained precarious. The Hotak forces spread to take more major towns in the South. In late June 1724 Lar was occupied by the Afghans, and on November 3 Bandar Abbas was occupied by an Afghan force coming from Lar.

Krusinski describes a raid toward the Gulf made once Shiraz had a garrison. A detachment of 400 men reached Bandar Abbas. The Persians living in the surrounding farms fled with their goods to Hormuz. The English and Dutch company factors stayed shut in their houses, which the Afghans did not dare attack, and bought them off with provisions handed over without letting the soldiers inside. The raid lasted two months and achieved little beyond frightening the Persians. Because the air at Bandar Abbas was deadly to strangers for most of the year, no more than 40 of the 400 rejoined the army. (Note: Krusinski does not date the raid, and it is unclear whether it is the same event as the occupation of Bandar Abbas from Lar on 3 November 1724.) Otter also records that the inhabitants of Bandar Abbas crossed to Hormuz and that the Europeans fortified themselves in their factories.
