= Hotak =

Ghilji Pashtun tribe

The Hotak (Pashto: هوتک) or Hotaki (هوتکي) is a tribe of the Ghilji confederacy of the Pashtun people who live mainly in Afghanistan.

== History ==
The first king to take power in Kandahar, Afghanistan, was Mirwais Hotak (1673–1715). Mirwais Hotak led a revolt against the Safavid dynasty and successfully established the Hotak dynasty in 1709. After his death in 1715, he was succeeded by Abdul Aziz Hotak. Abdul Aziz was killed in 1717 by his nephew, Mahmud Hotak, who would go on to war with the Safavids. Mahmud successfully captured Isfahan and established Hotak rule in Iran. Mahmud Hotak was assassinated in 1725 by his cousin, Ashraf Hotak. Under Ashraf's rule, the Hotaks would be kicked out of Persia. After Ashraf's death, Hussain Hotak would succeed him and would be deposed from power by Nader Shah in the Siege of Kandahar, ending the Hotak dynasty. Later Hotak rulers include Mullah Omar, who founded the Taliban, and was the ruler of the Afghanistan from 1996 to 2001. The Taliban would regain power and re-establish the Emirate after a near twenty year long conflict from 2001 to 2021.

== See also ==
- Hotak dynasty
- Mirwais Hotak
- Tokhi
- Nazo Tokhi
- Pashtun tribes
