= Hotak revolt =

Afghan uprising against Safavids

- Part of Afghan Rebellions of 1709–1726
Date	21 April 1709
Location	Kandahar, Safavid Iran (modern-day Afghanistan)
Result	Hotak victory
Territorial changes	Establishment of the Hotak Empire

Belligerents
Hotak Afghans	Safavid Iran

Commanders and leaders
Mirwais Hotak	Gurgin Khan †

Strength
Unknown	Unknown

Casualties and losses
Unknown	Entire garrison

The Hotak revolt was a major uprising by the Afghan Hotak tribe against Safavid Persian rule in 1709, led by Mirwais Hotak. The rebellion was triggered by the oppressive and provocative behavior of the Georgian commander Gurgin Khan and his troops, who governed Kandahar on behalf of the Safavid Empire.

Gurgin Khan's administration imposed heavy taxes on the local Sunni Afghan population and seized goods, women, and children. His predominantly Shi‘ite Georgian soldiers reportedly desecrated Sunni mosques by bringing pigs inside and drinking wine, deeply offending the local population. There were also widespread reports of abuse and killings of Afghan children by the Georgian forces, which intensified resentment among the Afghans.

Mir Wais Hotak initially sought redress through the Safavid court but was imprisoned. After skillfully regaining favor and receiving a fatwa legitimizing rebellion, he returned to Kandahar to lead the revolt. In April 1709, taking advantage of the absence of most Georgian troops, Afghan forces launched a surprise attack that killed Gurgin Khan and seized control of Kandahar.

This rebellion marked the start of the Hotak dynasty and significantly weakened Safavid authority in the region.
