= Battle of Gulnabad =

1722 battle in Iran

Hotaki-Safavid War
- Part of Afghan Rebellions of 1709–1726
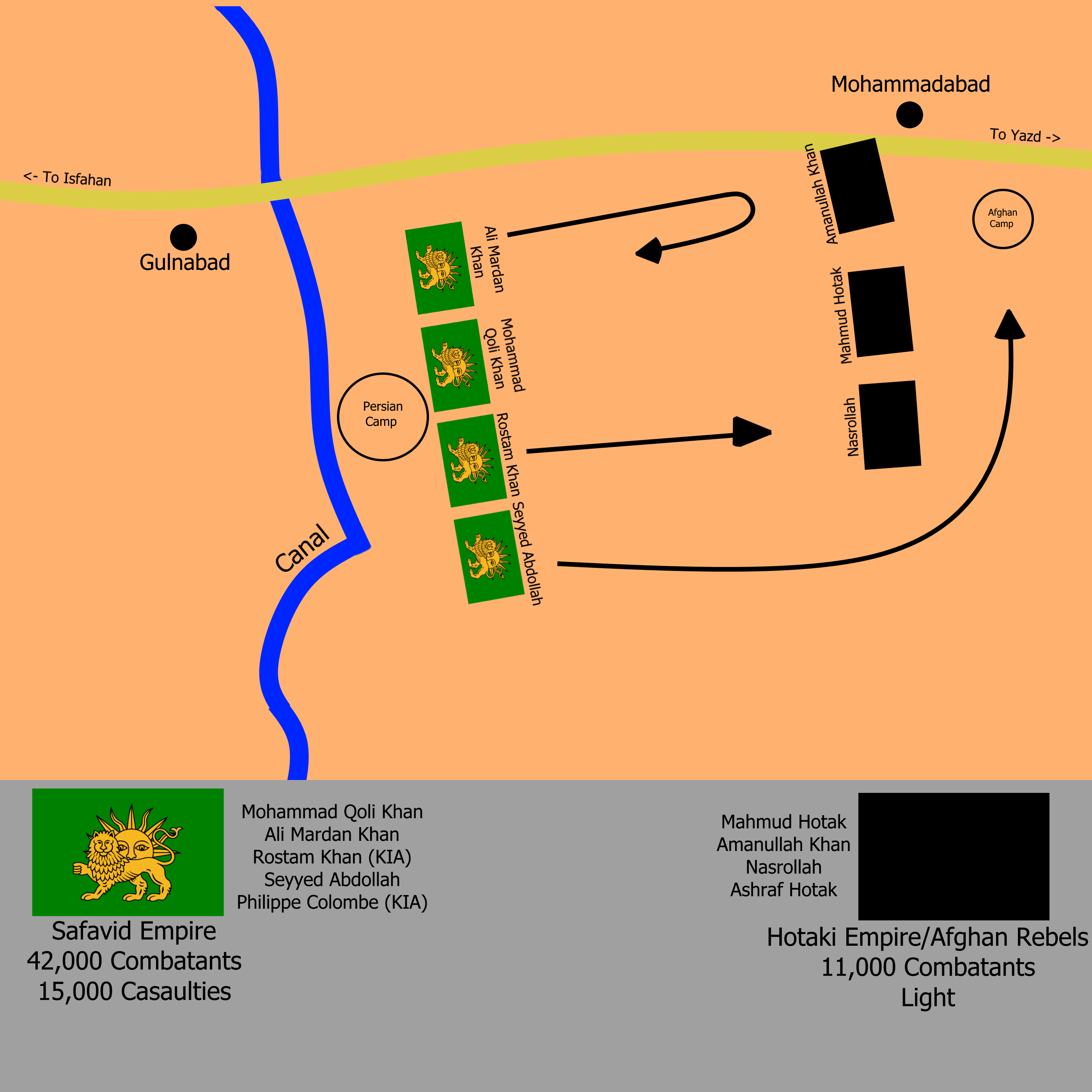
- A diagram of the battle as well as casualties
Date	Sunday, March 8, 1722
Location	Golūnābād, Isfahan, Iran
Result	Hotaki victory

Belligerents
Safavid Empire	Hotak Dynasty

Commanders and leaders
Mohammad Qoli Khan; Ali Mardan Khan; Rustam Khan †; Philippe Colombe †; Seyyed Abdollah	Mahmud Hotak; Ashraf Hotak; Amanullah Khan; Nesrollah

Strength
42,000–50,000+: 24 cannon	10,000–11,000: 100 zamburaks

Casualties and losses
5,000–15,000	Unknown

The Battle of Gulnabad (Pashto: د ګلون اباد جګړه, romanized: Dh Gulonābād Jaghrha; Persian: نبرد گلون‌آباد, romanized: Nabard-e Golūnābād) was fought between the military forces from the Hotak dynasty and the army of the Safavid Empire on Sunday, March 8, 1722. It further cemented the eventual fall of the Safavid dynasty, which had been declining for decades.

== Aftermath ==
After the battle was won, the Hotak Afghans began slowly but surely to march on deeper into Persia, and eventually towards Isfahan, the Safavid Persian capital. Numbers and casualty figures of the Gulnabad battle are believed to be between 5,000 and 15,000 dead Safavid soldiers.

== See also ==
- Battle of Damghan
