= Tazkerat al-Moluk =

Persian-language administrative manual by Mirza Sami'a

The Tazkerat al-Moluk (Persian: تذکرة الملوک, "Memorial for kings") is a Persian-language manual composed by Mirza Sami'a for the Hotak rulers after their conquest of Isfahan in 1722, which had served as the capital of Safavid Iran. Along with the Dastur al-Moluk, it serves as an essential document of the administrative structure of the Safavid government.

Numerous high-ranking Safavid administrators were slain by the Hotak ruler Mahmud Hotak and his brother Ashraf Hotak, who also destroyed the majority of Safavid records. Ruling most of Iran, however, Mahmud began to regret his hasty actions. Ghilzay chiefs were not unfamiliar with bureaucratic procedure as they had long served as the kalantars of Kandahar under the Safavids. They therefore sought assistance and rebuilt the central bureaucracy. It was then that Mahmud ordered Mirza Sami'a to compose the Tazkerat al-Moluk. By the time the Tazkerat al-Moluk was finished, Mahmud was dead, and it was thus presented to Ashraf, who had succeeded him.

== Sources ==
- Floor, Willem (2018). "Tribal Resurgence in the Eighteenth Century: A Useful Label?". In Axworthy, Michael (ed.). Crisis, Collapse, Militarism and Civil War: The History and Historiography of 18th Century Iran. Oxford University Press. pp. 151–162. ISBN 978-0-19-025033-1.
- Marcinkowski, M. Ismail (2008). "Taḏkerat al-moluk". Encyclopaedia Iranica.
