= Nazo Tokhi =

Afghan poet and writer (1651–1717)

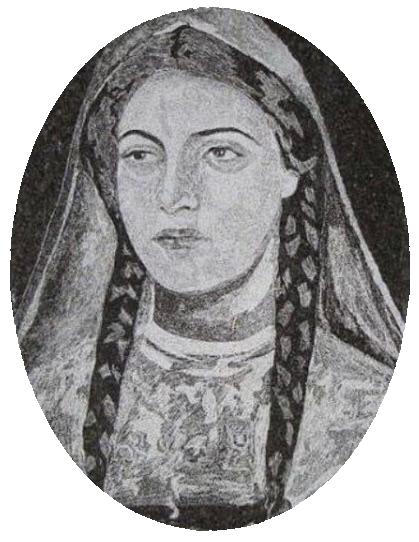
- Depiction of Nazo Tokhi
- Born: c. 1651; Kandahar, Safavid Iran
- Died: c. 1717 (aged about 66); Kandahar, Hotak Empire
- Other names: Nazo Ana, Nazo Nya
- Known for: Poetry, Afghan unity, bravery
- Spouse: Salim Khan Hotak
- Children: Mirwais Hotak

Nazo Tokhi (Pashto: نازو توخي) (commonly known as Nazo Ana, Nazo the Grandmother; c. 1651 – c. 1717) was an Afghan poet and writer in the Pashto language. Mother of the famous early-18th century Afghan king Mirwais Hotak, she grew up in an influential family in the Kandahar region. She is remembered as a brave woman warrior in Afghan history and as the "Mother of the Afghan Nation".

== Life and writing ==
Nazo Tokhi was born into a powerful and wealthy Pashtun family in the village of Spozhmayiz Gul, near Thazi, in the Kandahar Province of Afghanistan, in or about the year 1651. Her father, Sultan Malakhai Tokhi, was a prominent head of the Tokhi Pashtun tribe and governor of the Ghazni region. She was married to Salim Khan Hotak, son of Karam Khan. The famous Afghan ruler of the Hotak dynasty, Mirwais Hotak, was her son, and Mahmud Hotak and Hussain Hotak were her grandsons.

Nazo became a learned poet and courteous person; people knew her by her loving and caring nature. Nazo's father had paid close attention to her education and upbringing, inducing learned men in Kandahar to educate her fully. She came to be regarded as the "Mother of the Afghan Nation", gaining respect through her poetry and her strong support for the Pashtunwali code. Nazo called for Pashtunwali to be made the law of the confederacy of Pashtun tribes, and she arbitrated conflicts between the Ghilji and Sadozai tribes so as to encourage their alliance against the foreign Persian Safavid rulers. Her poetic contributions to Afghan culture are highly regarded even today.

When their father was killed in battle near Sur mountain, Nazo's brother went into battle to avenge him and left Nazo in charge of the household and fortress. She put on a sword and defended the fortress alongside the men.

=== Poetry ===
This is a translated excerpt from Nazo Tokhi's poetry (in the original Pashto, one of the two thousand or so couplets which she composed):

Dew drops from an early dawn narcissus
as a tear drops from a melancholy eye;
O beauty, I asked, what makes you cry?
Life is too short for me, it answered,
My beauty blooms and withers in a moment,
as a smile which comes and forever fades away.

— Nazo Tokhi

=== Legendary dream ===
Legend holds that Nazo Ana had an extraordinary dream on the night her son Mirwais Hotak was born.

On the night Mirwais was born (1673), his mother, Nazo Ana, dreamed of Shaykh Beṭ Nīkə (who is the folkloric leader or ancestor of the Bettani confederacy of Pashtuns). He told Nazo to take best care of the new baby because when the child grows up, the country would be blessed by his services. Nazo Ana, from time to time, recalled the miraculous dream to her son and advise him to perform deeds with authenticity. Young Mirwais eternally followed his mother's advice.

=== Death ===
Nazo Ana died in or about 1717 at the age of about 66, two years after her son Mirwais's death. After her death, her cause was taken up by Zarghuna Ana, the mother of Afghan Emir Ahmad Shah Durrani.

== Legacy ==
Nazo Ana is revered as a heroine among the Afghans. Various Afghan schools and other institutions are named after her.

== See also ==
- Tokhi
- Malalai of Maiwand
- Hotak dynasty
- Pashto literature and poetry
