= Siege of Kandahar =

1737–1738 siege of Kandahar, Afghanistan by Afsharid Iranian armies

Coordinates: 31°37′N 65°43′E

- Part of Campaigns of Nader Shah and Persian–Afghan Wars
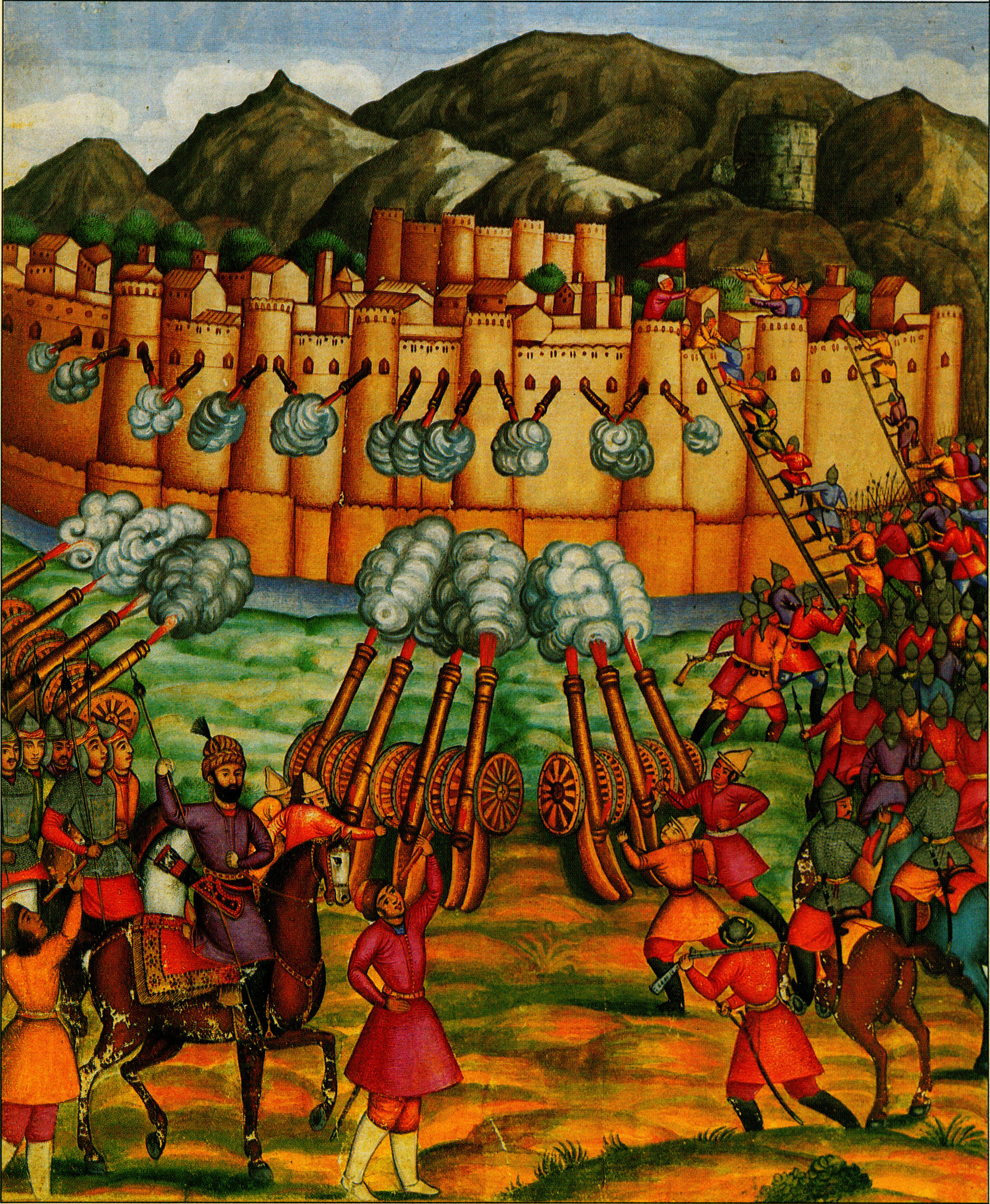
- Illustration of siege of Kandahar By Nader Shah in 1738
Date	April 1737 – 24 March 1738
Location	Old Kandahar, Hotak Sultanate (present-day Afghanistan)
Result	Afsharid victory
Territorial changes	Kandahar and environs are incorporated into Afsharid Persia, part of the city was destroyed by Nader Shah; Fall of the Hotak dynasty

Belligerents
Afsharid Iran	Hotak dynasty

Commanders and leaders
Nader Shah; Reza Qoli Afshar; Mulla Adineh Mostafi Bakhtiari; Tahmasp Qoli Khan Jalayer; Kalbi khan Osivand; Saber Sultan Raki	Hussain Hotaki (POW) (surrendered); Mohammad Seidal Khan (POW); Younis Kakar †

Strength
80,000	Unknown

Casualties and losses
Unknown	All killed or captured

The Siege of Kandahar (Persian: محاصرهٔ قندهار) began when Nader Shah's Afsharid army invaded southern Afghanistan to topple the last Hotaki stronghold of Loy Kandahar, which was held by Hussain Hotaki. It took place in the Old Kandahar area of the modern city of Kandahar in Afghanistan and lasted until March 24, 1738, when the Hotaki Afghans were defeated by the Persian army, namely the Afsharid empire.

== Background ==
After expelling the Afghans from Iran in 1729, Tahmasp Qoli Khan had planned to attack the Hotaks and reconquer Kandahar in 1730. However, multiple events postponed this. As Hussain Hotaki was afraid of an Afsharid attack on Kandahar he incited the Abdalis of Herat to revolt, causing Nader to abandon his campaign against the Ottomans and incorporate Herat back into the Safavid Empire. This was done with the Fall of Herat on February 27, 1732. When Nader made peace with the Ottomans in 1736, he began to prepare to attack.

== Siege ==
Much of the duration of the siege saw little fighting as Nader Shah forces' lack of heavy artillery forced them to settle into a blockade of the fortified town. As the Persians became more impatient, they made several attempts to take the city by storm but the Afghans defiantly repulsed these attempts. Although in the end the siege was won by Nader shah after almost a year of besieging Kandahar

== Bakhtiari assault ==
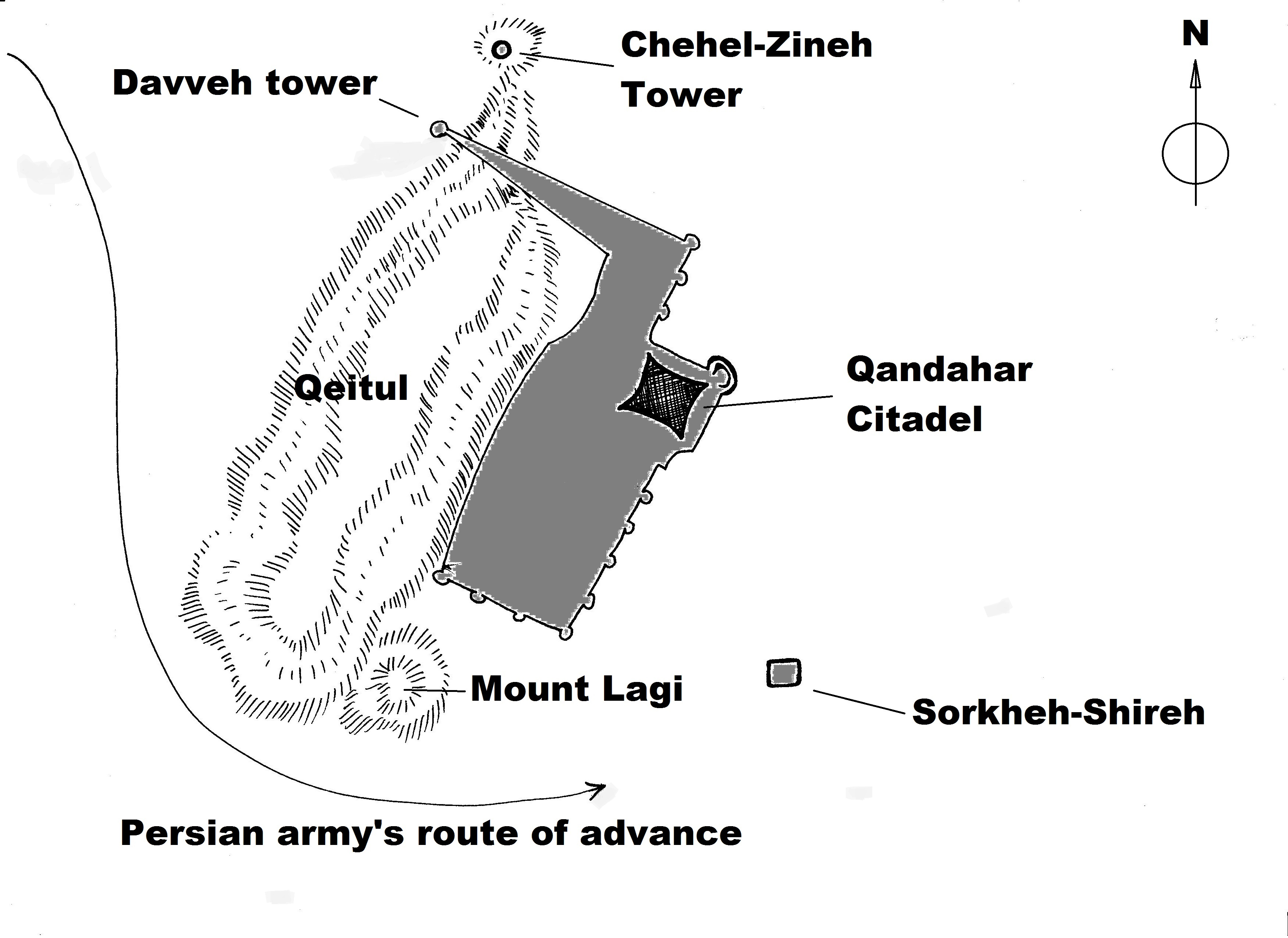
Kandahar and its environs

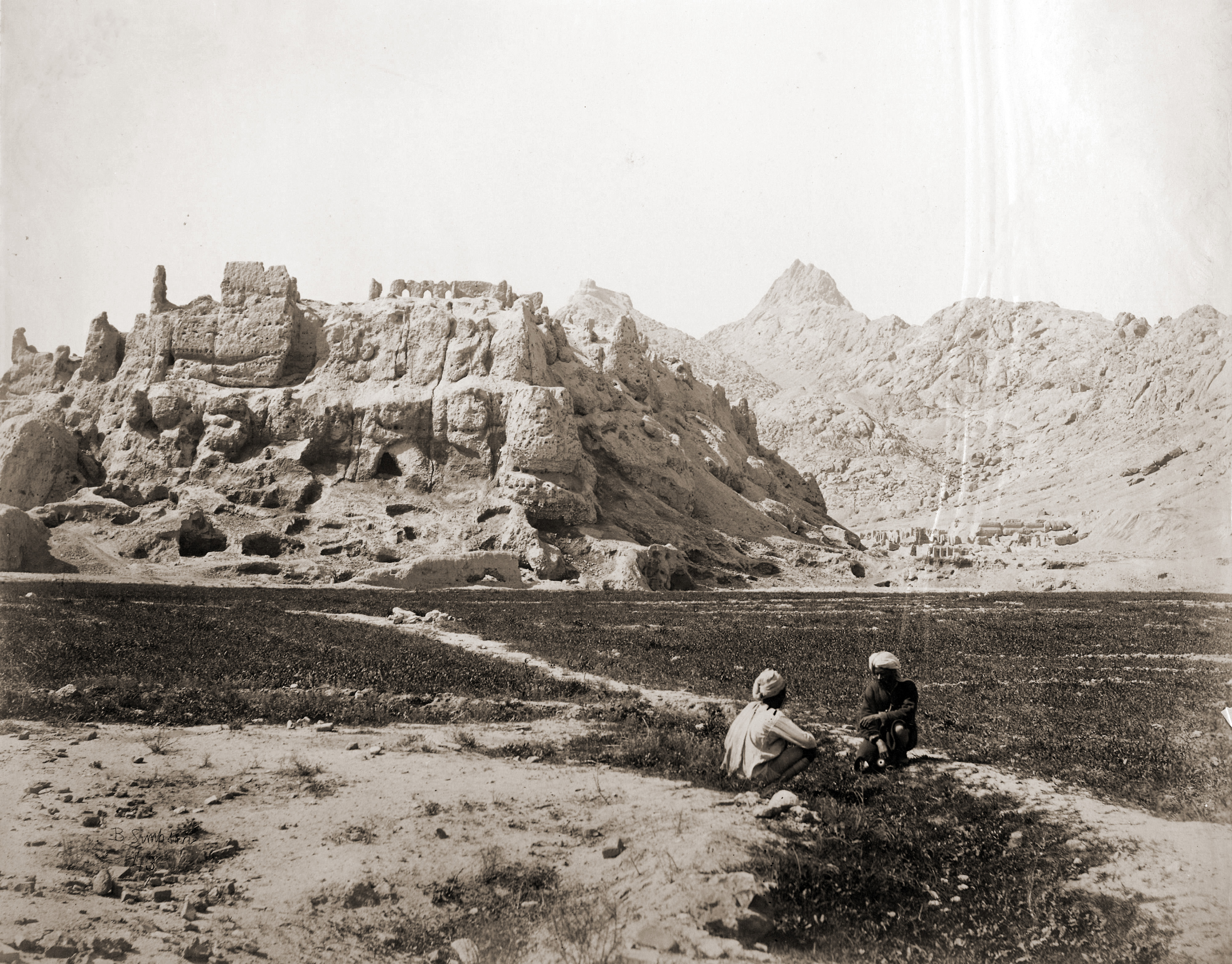
Ruins of Old Kandahar Citadel that was destroyed by the Persian Afsharid army in 1738.

In anticipation of the siege, the Afghans had stockpiled large amounts of provisions in the fortified town and although starvation had begun to take hold by the end of 1737, Nader realized that it would take a long time for the Afghans to exhaust the last of their provisions. He was unsure of his position in Persia; although he had deposed Tahmasp II, the deposed ex-king was still alive and Nader did not want to remain bogged down in the siege. On March 23, 1738, Nader selected 3,000 men from among the Bakhtiari contingent of his troops to lead a human wave assault on Kandahar. A Bakhtiari named Mullah Adineh Mostafi was selected to lead the assault party.

Nader initially tried to dissuade the mullah from taking part in the attack given the threat he faced but Adineh insisted on taking part. The night before the attack, Nader personally addressed the Bakhtiaris and told them that they would each be given 1,000 rupees and a share of the spoils of the city if the assault succeeded. On March 24, the assault commenced and the Bakhtiaris surged forth from their concealed positions on the cliffs of Chehel Zina and charged towards the city. The Afghan gunners in the fortified city guard towers managed to kill some of the attackers but many of the Bakhtiaris reached the city walls and used their ladders to scale it. Mullah Adineh was the first to make it to the top and a fierce struggle took place atop the Kandahar city walls. Gradually, the Bakhtiaris managed to take control of the walls and proceeded to take the inner fortifications of the city. The attackers then raised guns atop the walls and used them to bombard the city.

The Afghans made several attempts to retake the city's fortifications but they were beaten back by heavy fire from the Bakhtiari Jazayerchis. Realizing the hopelessness of the struggle, Hussain Hotaki and a few Afghans retreated into the Kandahar citadel, leaving the rest of the inhabitants of the city to be killed or captured. The Persians then proceeded to commandeer the cannons installed on the city's walls and used these cannons to bombard the citadel. Finally, the next day, on March 25, 1738, Hussain Hotaki and the rest of his retinue which had taken shelter in the citadel, surrendered.

== Aftermath ==
Nader Shah generously rewarded the Bakhtiaris and personally rewarded Adineh Mostafi with a bag full of gold. Hussain Hotaki was treated leniently and was exiled to Mazandaran along with the rest of the Hotaki royal family; it is presumed that he and his family were later killed during the Zand massacres of Afghans in what is now northern Iran. On the other hand, Nader was suspicious of Hussain's main military commander, Mohammad Seidal Khan, and suspected him of being a troublemaker; Nader therefore ordered that he be blinded.

The city of Kandahar was systematically destroyed by artillery fire and the surviving inhabitants were transferred to a new city that the Afsharid forces had prepared and planned to build about 6 miles south-east of the ancient city. Nader named the city "Naderabad", after himself. The old city of Kandahar was not reoccupied but the ruins of the old Kandahar Citadel remain visible to this day. The capture of Kandahar is a resonant event in Bakhtiari Oral history and in Lur culture in general; it is an event which has become a cultural touchstone.

== See also ==
- Military of the Afsharid dynasty of Persia
- Durrani dynasty

== Sources ==
- Michael Axworthy, The Sword of Persia: Nader Shah, from Tribal Warrior to Conquering Tyrant Hardcover 348 pages (26 July 2006) Publisher: I.B. Tauris Language: English ISBN 1-85043-706-8
