= Toman =

Toman may refer to:

- Toman (name)
- Iranian toman, former Iranian currency unit and planned replacement for the rial
- Malay term for the giant snakehead
- Toman (DJ), a Dutch DJ
- Toman (film), a 2018 Czech historical film
