= Pishin =

Pishin may refer to:

Iran

- Pishin, Iran, city in Sistan and Baluchestan Province, Iran
  - Pishin District (Iran), district in Sistan and Baluchestan Province, Iran

Pakistan

- Pishin, Pakistan, city in Balochistan, Pakistan
  - Pishin District, district in Balochistan, Pakistan
  - Pishin Valley, valley in Pishin District, Balochistan, Pakistan
