= Abdul Aziz Hotak =

Emir of Greater Kandahar (died 1717)

Abdul Aziz Hotak عبد العزیز هوتک

Emir of Afghanistan
- Reign: November 1715 – 1717
- Coronation: November 1715, Kandahar
- Predecessor: Mirwais Hotak
- Successor: Mahmud Hotak
- Born: Kandahar
- Died: 1717; Kandahar
Names
- Abdul Aziz Hotak
- Dynasty: Hotak dynasty
- Father: Salim Khan
- Mother: Nazo Tokhi
- Religion: Sunni Islam

Shāh Abdul Azīz Hotak (Pashto/Dari: عبد العزیز هوتک; died 1717) was the second ruler of the Ghilji Hotak dynasty of Kandahar, in what is today the state of Afghanistan. He was crowned in 1715 after the death of his brother, Mirwais Hotak. He was the father of Ashraf Hotak, the fourth ruler of the Hotak dynasty. Abdul Aziz was killed in 1717 by his nephew Mahmud Hotak. The tradition of parricide continued as Mahmud died at the hands of his cousin and Abdul Azīz's son Ashraf.

== Early life ==
Abdul Aziz was born to a wealthy and politically connected family in the Kandahar area. His family had been involved in social and community services for many years. He was the son of Salim Khan and Nazo Tokhi (also known as "Nazo Anaa"), grandson of Karum Khan and great grandson of Ismail Khan, a descendant of Malikyar, the original head of the Hotaki or Hotaks. The Hotaki clan is a prominent branch of Ghilji, a major tribe among the Pashtuns.

Hajji Amanullah Hottak reports in his book that the Ghilji tribe were the original residents of Ghor or Gherj. This tribe migrated later to obtain lands in southeastern Afghanistan and then grew in number in this region.

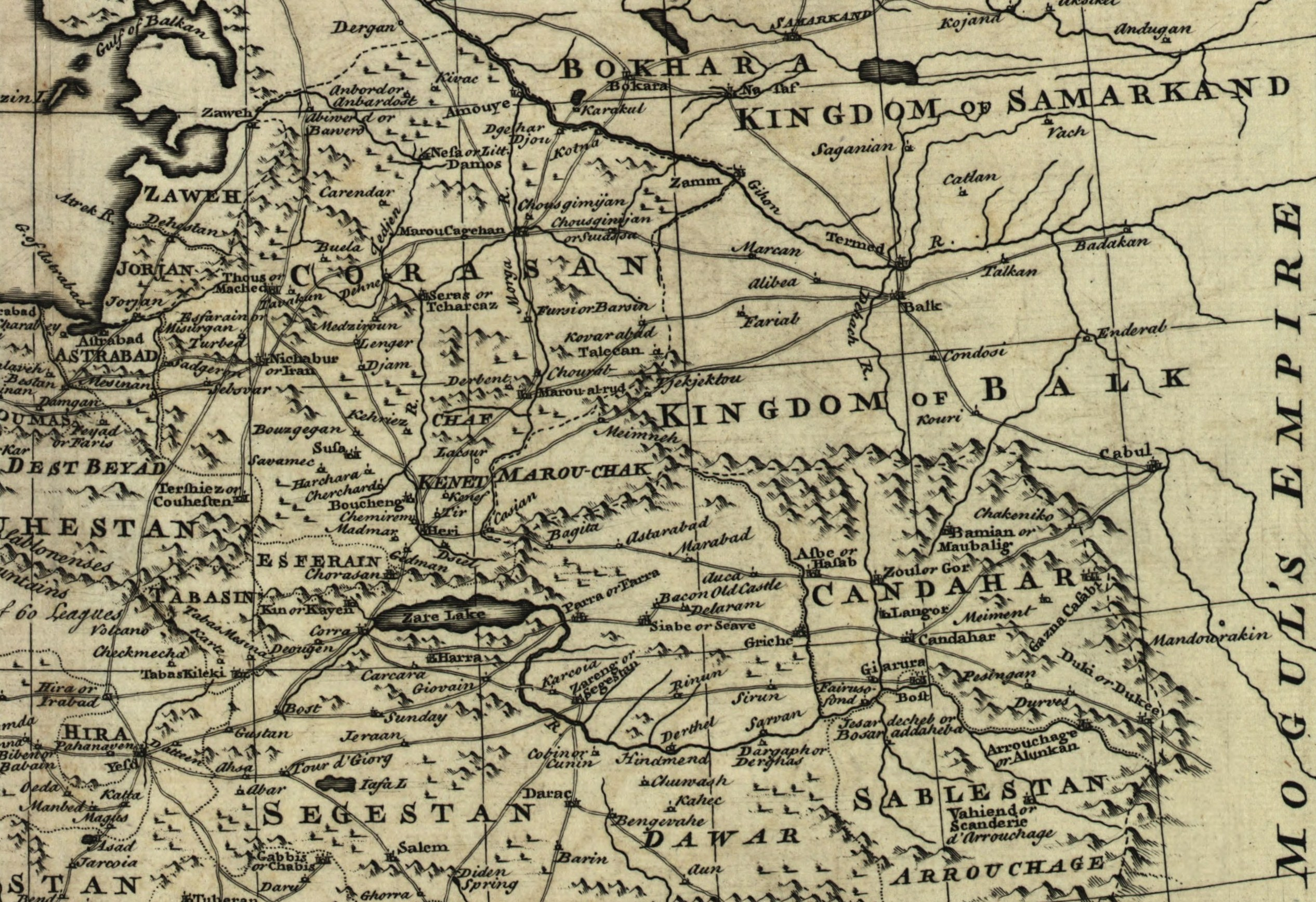
Greater Kandahar (Candahar) during the Safavid dynasty and Mughal period.

In 1707, Kandahar was in a state of chaos due to it being fought over for control by the Shi'a Persian Safavids and the Sunni Moghuls of India. Mirwais Khan, a Sunni tribal chief whose influence with his fellow-countrymen made him an object of suspicion, was held as a political prisoner by the Safavid governor of the region, Gurgin Khan, and sent to the Safavids' court at Isfahan. He was later released and even allowed to meet regularly with the Shah, Sultan Husayn. Having ingratiated himself with the Safavid court, Mirwais sought and obtained permission to perform the pilgrimage to Mecca in the Ottoman Empire. He had studied carefully all the military weaknesses of the Safavids while he spent time in their court.

In 1709 Mirwais and Abdul Aziz began organising their countrymen in preparation for a major uprising. When a significant number of the Safavid garrison were on an expedition outside the city, followers of Mirwais and Abdul Aziz fell on the remainder and killed the greater number of them, including Gurgin Khan.

The Pashtun tribes rankled under the ruling Safavids because of their continued attempts to forcefully convert them from Sunni to Shia Islam. After Gurgin Khan and his escort were killed in April 1709, the Hotak tribe took control of the city and the province. The Pashtun rebels then defeated a large Qizilbash and Persian army, sent to gain control over the area.

Several half-hearted attempts to subdue the rebellious city having failed, the Persian Government despatched Khusraw Khán, nephew of the late Gurgín Khán, with an army of 30,000 men to effect its subjugation, but in spite of an initial success, which led the Afgháns to offer to surrender on terms, his uncompromising attitude impelled them to make a fresh desperate effort, resulting in the complete defeat of the Persian army (of whom only some 700 escaped) and the death of their general. Two years later, in 1713, another Persian army commanded by Rustam Khán was also defeated by the rebels, who thus secured possession of the whole province of Qandahár.

— Edward G. Browne, 1924

== Death ==
Abdul Aziz sided with the Persians and re-entered the suzerainty of Safavid Iran, which proved unpopular with fellow Afghans. Mahmud Hotak, his nephew, seeing that his father, Mirwais Hotak's achievements would be washed away, assembled many of his fathers loyal followers, and entered the royal palace. Mahmud Hotak himself killed Abdul Aziz, and ascended the throne of the Hotaks at the age of 18.

Abdul Aziz was buried at a mausoleum next to his brother in the Kokaran section of Kandahar City in Afghanistan.

== See also ==
- Hotak dynasty
- History of Afghanistan

Preceded by Mirwais Hotak	Emir of Afghanistan; 1715–1717	Succeeded by Mahmud Hotak
