= Philippe Colombe =

French artillery commander for Safavid Empire

- Born: Paris, France
- Died: March 8 1722; Golūnābād, Isfahan, Iran
- Military career
- Allegiance: Tsardom of Russia; Safavid Empire
- Conflicts: Afghan Rebellions of 1709–1726; Battle of Gulnabad †

Philippe Colombe (died March 1722) was a French army officer, most famous for his command of the Safavid artillery corps during the reign of Soltan Husayn.

== Biography ==
A native of Paris, Colombe had served in the army of the Russian Tsardom before moving to Safavid Iran. Entering service under Sultan Husayn (r. 1694–1722), Colombe came to be at the head of the empire's military ordnance. During the decisive battle against the rebellious Afghans in March 1722, at Gulnabad, Colombe was in command of the artillery corps (although he was nominally under Ahmad Khan, the tupchi-bashi), which hosted 24 cannons. During the battle, Colombe and his corps were left without protection, which resulted in them getting frantically attacked by the Afghans, and killed.

== Sources ==
- Fisher, William Bayne; Jackson, Peter; Lockhart, Lawrence, eds. (1986). "The Safavid Period". The Cambridge History of Iran (Vol. 6). Cambridge: Cambridge University Press. ISBN 978-0521200943.
- Floor, Willem; Herzig, Edmund, eds. (2015). Iran and the World in the Safavid Age. I.B.Tauris. ISBN 978-1780769905.
- Mikaberidze, Alexander, ed. (2011). Conflict and Conquest in the Islamic World: A Historical Encyclopedia (Vol. 1). ABC-CLIO. p. 352. ISBN 978-1598843378.
