= Shah Ahmad Marashi =

King of Persia

Ahmad Shah Marashi was a Safavid Iranian Shah 1726–1728 that succeeded Shah Tahmasp II, while the Shah was in the northern provinces fighting with Nader Shah Afshar against the Russians and the Ottomans. Ahmad Shah Marashi was born as Mirza Seyed Ahmad Hossaini Marashi, eldest son of Mirza Abul Qasim Hossaini Marashi.

In 1722, Mahmud Shah Ghilzai invaded Iran and sacked the capital, Isfahan. By 1726, Mirza Seyed Ahmad seized the provinces of Fars and Kerman. In Kerman, the Marashi-Safavid noble, on behalf of Shah Tahmasp II, crowned himself Shah in the southern provinces on November 8, 1726. This was the perfect time, since the Afghan Ghilzai Dynasty was having a political problem, thus leaving a vacuum to be filled up. But, Ashraf Shah Ghilzai invaded Kerman and defeated Ahmad Shah in 1728, thus ending his rulership. His execution took place on the banks of the Rud-e Zayande (Zayandeh River), near Oul-e Khwaju in August 1728.
