= Loy Kandahar =

Historical region in Afghanistan

Loy Kandahar (Pashto: لوی کندهار, pronounced [loɪ 'kand̪(ah)ɑr]; lit. 'Greater Kandahar') is a historical and cultural region of Afghanistan, comprising the modern Afghan provinces of Kandahar, Helmand, Farah, Uruzgan, as well as parts of Nimruz and Zabul, and the Pashtun majority northern part of Balochistan including cities like Quetta, Chaman and many other areas (the latter known as “South Pashtunkhwa). In 1709, Mirwais Hotak made the region an independent kingdom and turned Kandahar city into the capital of the Hotak dynasty. In 1747, Ahmad Shah Durrani, founder of the Durrani dynasty, made Kandahar the capital of the Afghan Empire.

Loy Kandahar is vaguely defined by a common culture and history that is connected to the local indigenous tribes that reside in the region. Some people may refer to these areas as being under the "Kandahari cultural sphere of influence". Particular styles of clothing, articles of clothing, turban styles, turban cloth colors, dialects of Pashto language, etc. may sometimes be associated with specific tribes indigenous to Loy Kandahar and thus integrate themselves into regional culture. For instance, a Pashtun tribesman from Loy Kandahar may quickly recognize a Pashtun from Loya Paktia based upon his turban style and color. Likewise, a Pashtun from Loya Paktia may recognize someone from Loy Kandahar based upon his unique style of collarless kameez (shirt) with specific embroidered patterns on the front. There are many subtle and intricate cultural indicators of this type that are not recorded in any known written history but simply known and observed by the tribesmen of the various Pashtun regions of Afghanistan and Pakistan.

== Settlements ==
The largest cities is Kandahar, while other main towns of Loy Kandahar include Lashkargah, Qalati Ghilji, Quetta, Farah, Zhob, Tarinkot, Panjwayi, Girishk,Bala Buluk, Gizab, Shahjoy, and Delaram.

== Tribes ==
The population mostly consists of Noorzai, Popalzai, Barakzai, Alakozai, Achakzai, Few Kakar, Tareen, Sayed and some others tribes of Pashtuns. Predominant tribes with notable large populations native to Loy Kandahar are concentrated in the southern part of the region. Kochis are also common in the region, especially during the winter season.
