= Afghan Rebellions of 1709–1726 =

Series of uprisings in the Persian Empire

- Part of Persian–Afghan Wars
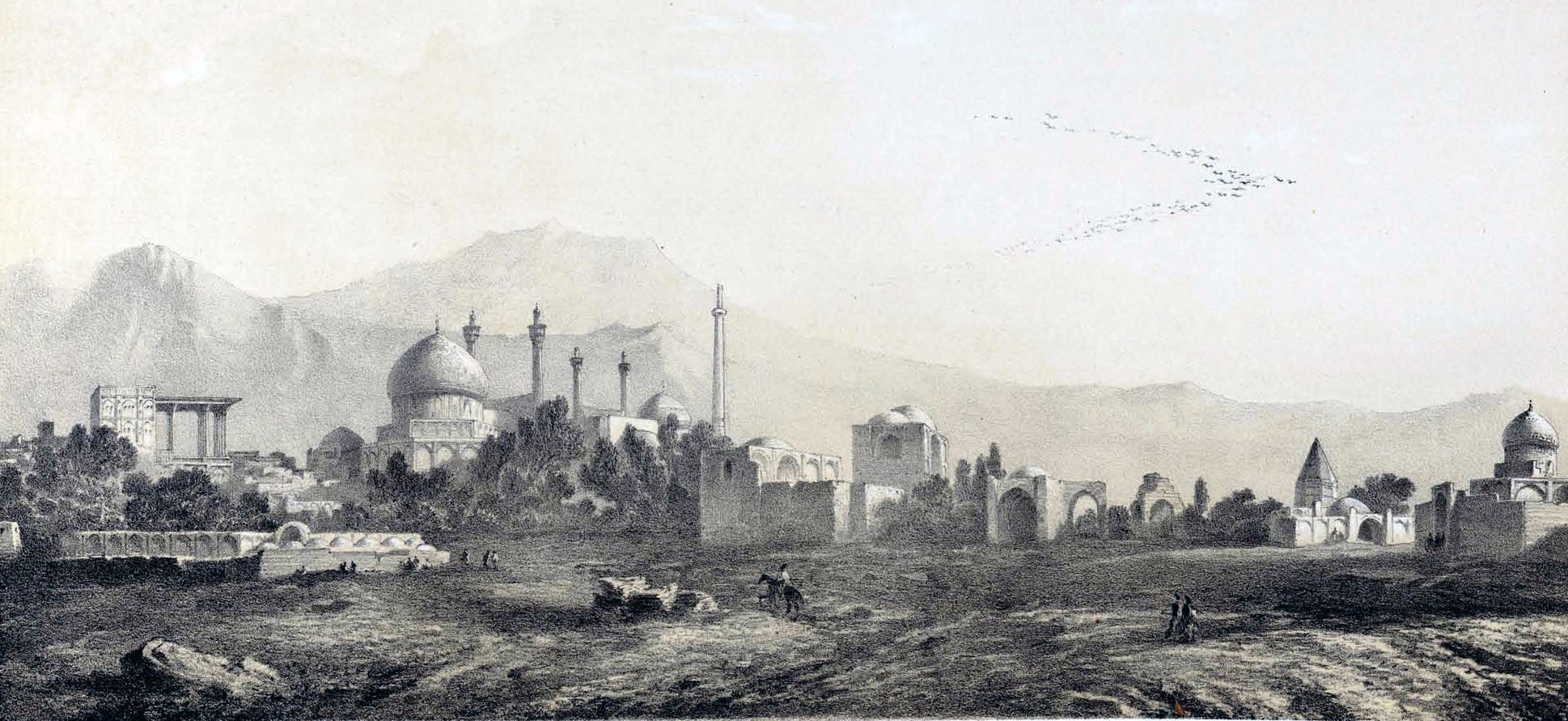
- Isfahan to the south side, 1840
Date	1709 – 1726
Location	Persian Empire (modern Iran and Afghanistan)
Result	Hotaki victory
Territorial changes	Swathes of Iran fall under Hotak rule

Belligerents
Hotak dynasty Sadozai Sultanate of Herat	Safavid Iran; Safavid loyalists

Commanders and leaders
Mirwais Hotak; Mahmud Hotak; Ashraf Hotak; Mohammad Zaman Khan	Sultan Husayn (executed); Tahmasp II; Lotf-Ali Khan Daghestani; Rustam Khan †; Philippe Colombe †; Gurgin Khan †; Kaikhosro †; Safi Quli Khan †; Baba Ali Beg †

Casualties and losses
Unknown	Unknown
- Estimates range from 1,000,000+ Persian civilian deaths to as much as 1/3 of Iran's population under Hotak rule

The Afghan Rebellions of 1709–1726 were a series of uprisings in which the Ghilzai Hotakis exploited Safavid weakness to rebel in Kandahar, establish an independent Afghan state, and invade Persia. The Afghans captured major cities and forced the surrender of Isfahan in 1722.

These revolts included the Persian–Afghan War (1709–1711) and the Afghan conquest of Persia (1717–1722), culminating in Russian and Ottoman interventions in Persia and subsequent wars with Nader Shah.
