= Toman (DJ) =

Dutch DJ and producer

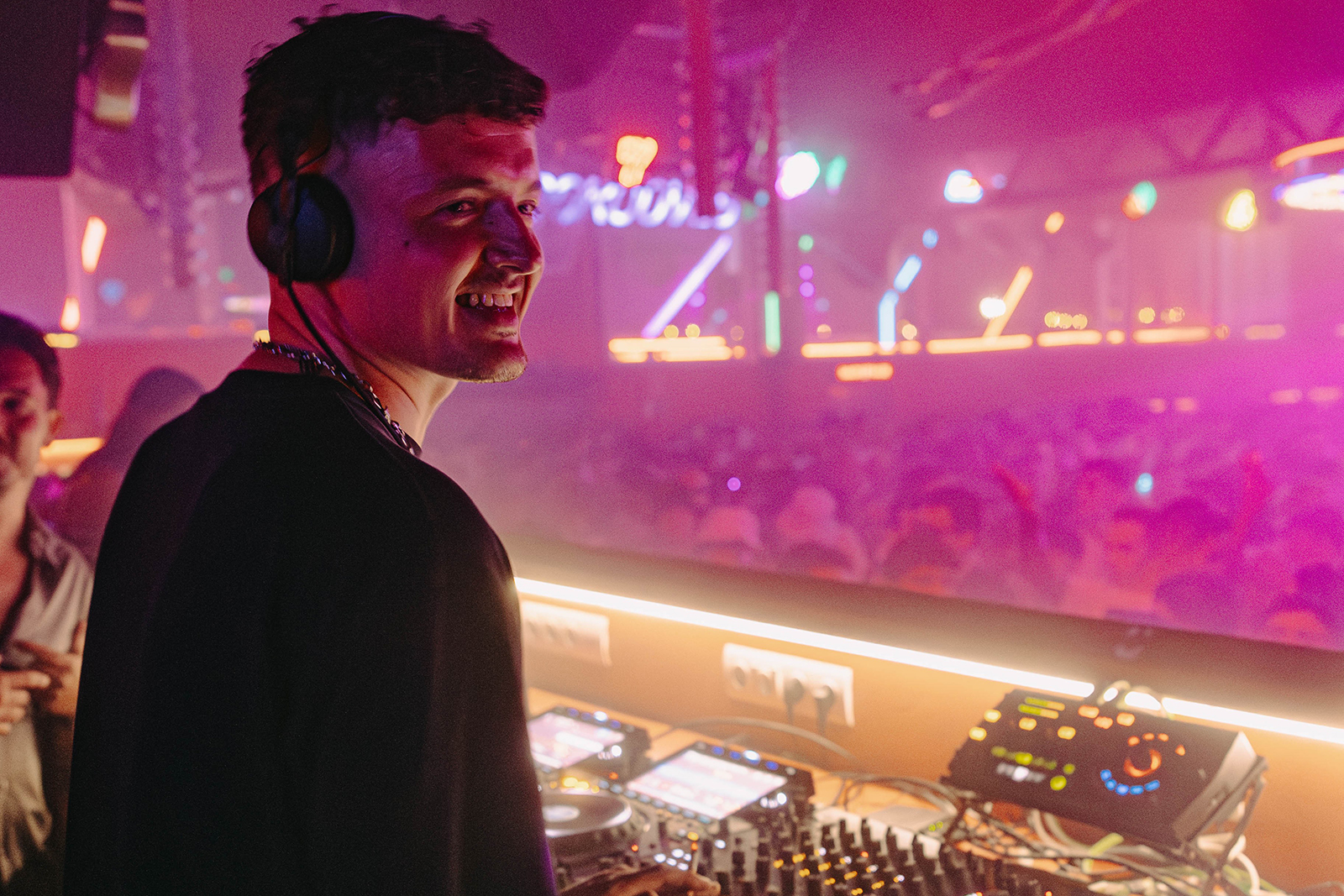
- Toman performing at Solid Grooves in DC10 in Ibiza, 2024

Background information
- Born: Tom Woerdman; Alphen aan den Rijn, Netherlands
- Genres: Minimal, Deep Tech, House
- Occupations: DJ, Music Producer, Label Owner
- Years active: 2017–present
- Labels: No Art, Solid Grooves, PIV, Cécille, High Ceilings
- Website: www.tomanmusic.com

Tom Woerdman, better known by the name of Toman, is a Dutch DJ, music producer. Toman has released music on No Art, Solid Grooves, PIV, Cécille and his own label High Ceilings.

== Career ==
In 2017, Toman released his debut EP, Solanas, on Cyclic Records.

He has performed at festivals including Awakenings, DGTL, and Tomorrowland, and at clubs including DC10 and Amnesia on Ibiza, and Club Space in Miami.

His club performances have been featured by international outlets such as DJ Mag and Ibiza Spotlight.

He has since released music through several Amsterdam-based labels, including No Art and PIV. In 2021, Toman released the single Am I Conscious on No Art, and collaborated with ANOTR on the track Be Heard, issued via No Art Red, the vinyl-oriented sublabel of No Art. In 2024, he released his first EP on the German label Cécille Records, which included the track Courtyard featuring his own vocals.

In early 2025, Toman founded the record label High Ceilings and released its first single, Emotion. Later that year, he followed up with the EP Seguimos on the same label.

== Recognition and awards ==
Toman's 2025 single "Verano En NY", was released on Solid Grooves. The track was played at clubs and festivals and ranked among the most Shazamed dance tracks on Ibiza in 2025.

In 2025, the track won the Track of the Summer award at the DJ Awards in Ibiza, a long-running international award ceremony dedicated to electronic music.

== Discography ==
=== EPs ===
- Solanas (Cyclic Records, 2017)
- Broodrooster EP (We_R House, 2018)
- Circles (Cyclic Records, 2018)
- Otopeni E.P. (No Art, 2019)
- Whatudo EP (Meta, 2019)
- Waves EP (PIV, 2019)
- Afterhours With You (Drumma Records, 2019)
- Gypsy Girl (Cyclic Records, 2019)
- Feel For You EP (MicroHertz, 2020)
- ENDZ035 (Eastenderz, 2020)
- Timewriter EP (Locus, 2020)
- Otro Mundo (No Art, 2021)
- Due EP (No Art, 2021)
- Madrugada (Cuttin' Headz, 2021)
- Am I Conscious (No Art, 2021)
- Kilombito Mal (No Art, 2022)
- Chevere (No Art, 2023)
- Dolce far niente (Cécille Records, 2024)
- Seguimos (High Ceilings, 2025)
- Backstage Beauties (High Ceilings, 2025)

=== Singles ===
- Don't Hesitate (No Art, 2019)
- Gamba Roja EP (Moan Recordings, 2019)
- Emotion (High Ceilings, 2025)
- Verano en NY (Solid Grooves Records, 2025)
- De La Buena (High Ceilings, 2026)
