= Judasz Tadeusz Krusinski =

Polish Jesuit (1675–1756)

Judasz Tadeusz Krusinski (Note: Also spelled "Judas Thaddeus".) (correctly, Polish: Krusiński) (born 1675 – died 1756) was a Polish Jesuit who lived in the Safavid Iran from 1707 to 1725/1728. He acted as an intermediary between the Papacy and the Iranian court, and also functioned as a court translator.

Proficient in Persian and well acquainted with the nation and its people, he was an inhabitant of the Safavid royal capital of Isfahan and a "first-hand witness" to the capture of the city by the rebellious Afghans in 1722. Krusinksi's accounts make him an important primary source on this particular period of the Safavid era.

== Sources ==
- Ferrer, José Cutillas (2018). "SPAIN: RELATIONS WITH PERSIA IN THE 16TH AND 17TH CENTURIES". Encyclopaedia Iranica.
- Malecka, Anna (2015). "How Turks and Persians Drank Coffee: A Little-known Document of Social History by Father J. T. Krusiński". Turkish Historical Review. 6 (2): 175–193. doi:10.1163/18775462-00602006.
- Matthee, Rudi (2008). "Jesuits in Safavid Persia". In Yarshater, Ehsan (ed.). Encyclopædia Iranica. Vol. XIV/6: Japan IV. Iranians in Japan–Jobbāʾi. London and New York: Routledge & Kegan Paul. pp. 634–638. ISBN 978-1-934283-07-3.
- Matthee, Rudi (2013). The History of the Late Revolutions in Persia: An Eyewitness Account of the Fall of the Safavid Dynasty, by Judas Thaddeus Krusinski. I.B.Tauris. pp. 1–904. ISBN 978-1780764689.
