= Toman (name) =

Other names
- Variant forms: Tomann, Thomann; Tománek, Tomandl

Toman is a surname of German and Czech origin.

Notable people with the name include:

- Toman (actor) (born 1993), Japanese actor and model

Notable people with the surname include:

- Anna Toman (born 1993), English field hockey player
- Andy Toman (born 1962), English footballer
- Cyril Toman, political activist in Northern Ireland
- Ioan Toman (born 1959), Romanian skeet shooter
- Jim Toman (born 1961), American college baseball coach
- Jiří Toman (1938–2020), Czech-born Swiss jurist and professor
- Karel Toman (1877–1946), Czech poet
- Karl Toman (1884–1950), Austrian politician and trade unionist
- Ladislav Toman (volleyball) (1934–2018), Czech volleyball player
- Ladislav Toman (sculptor) (1894–1935), Czech sculptor
- Lovro Toman (1827–1870), Slovenian revolutionary activist
- Marina Toman (born 1972), Serbian politician
- Milan Toman (born 1979), Czech ice hockey player
- Ron Toman (1934–2011), American football player and coach
- Toby Toman, British drummer
- Urban Toman (born 1997), Slovenian volleyball player
- Wilf Toman (1874–1917), English footballer
