= Mirwais Hotak =

Afghan ruler and founder of the Hotak dynasty

Mirwais Hotak ميرويس هوتک
- Emir of Afghanistan
- Sketch work of Mirwais Hotak

Emir of Afghanistan
- Reign: 21 April 1709 – November 1715
- Coronation: April 1709
- Predecessor: Soltan Hoseyn (As Shah of Iran)
- Successor: Abdul Aziz Hotak
- Born: c. 1673; Kandahar, Safavid Iran
- Died: November 1715 (aged c. 42); Kandahar, Hotak dynasty
- Burial: Kokaran, Kandahar, Afghanistan
- Spouse: Khanzada Sadozai
- Issue: Mahmud Hotak; Husayn Hotak
- Dynasty: Hotak
- Father: Salim Khan
- Mother: Nazo Tokhi
- Religion: Sunni Islam

Mirwais Khan Hotak (Note: Pashto: ميرويس خان هوتک, romanized: Mirwayis Xān Hotak [miɾ.waɪs xɑn ʔo.t̪ak, miɾ.wa.jis xɑn ho.t̪ak]; Persian: میرویس خان هوتک, romanized: Mīrwayīs Khān Hōtak [miːɾ.wájs xɑːn ʔoː.t̪ák, miːɾ.wä.jís xɑːn hoː.t̪ák]) (c. 1673 – November 1715) was an Afghan ruler from the Hotak sub-tribe of the Ghilji tribe of Pashtuns of Kandahar, Afghanistan, and the short-lived founder of the Hotak dynasty.

In 1709, after overthrowing and assassinating George XI of Kartil, the Safavid Persian governor, Hotak declared independence of the Loy Kandahar region, now southern Afghanistan. Hotak is widely known as Mirwais Nikə (ميرويس نيکه) or Mirwais Baba (ميرويس بابا)—"Mirwais the Grandfather" in Pashto.

== Background ==
George XI of Kartli was a Georgian-Safavid general who was defeated by the Safavid Empire for trying to revolt in Georgia, and lent his services to the empire. He was ordered to quell a suspected rebellion and to govern in Kandahar. The Safavid ruler Sultan Husayn strongly suspected the Ghilji had revolted and sent George to Kandahar ahead of a large Persian army. When he arrived, he saw that the Ghilji were not revolting.

Although the Ghilji were loyal to George, he preferred to strike fear into the Afghan tribes and treated the land as if he had conquered it. With many high-ranking officials sacked, George treated the Afghans like slaves. His government taxes on the local Sunni Afghan population and seized goods, women, and children. His predominantly Shi‘ite Georgian soldiers reportedly desecrated Sunni mosques by bringing pigs inside and drinking wine, deeply offending the local population. There were also widespread reports of abuse and killings of Afghan children by the Georgian forces, which intensified resentment among the Afghans.When the Ghil ji appealed to Husayn for proper representation without success, they planned a rebellion. The situation was unfavorable to them, because the best Persian general was entangled with a large Persian army occupying Kandahar.

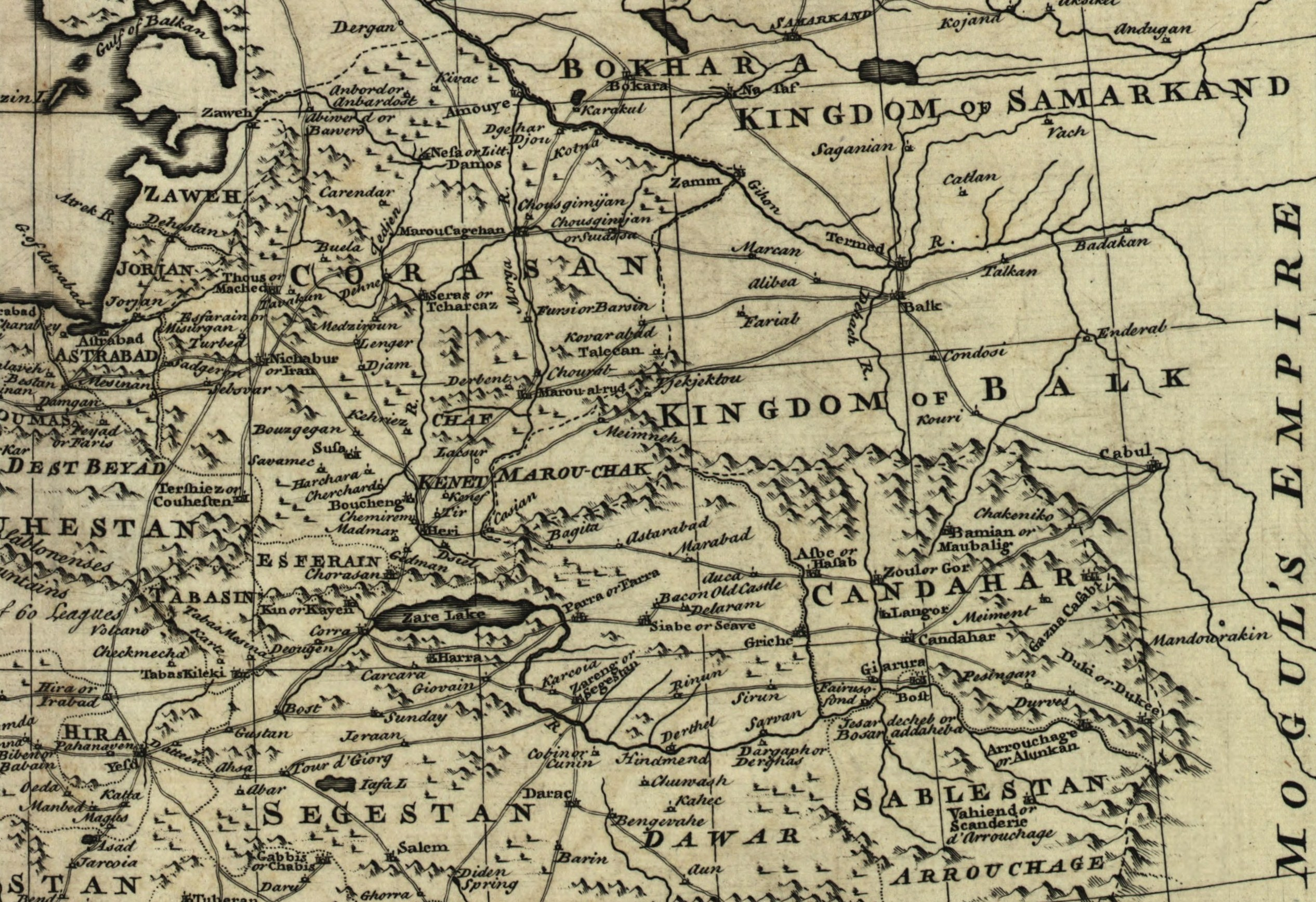
The Greater Kandahar region (Candahar) during the Safavid dynasty and Mughal period

== Rise to power ==
Prominent amongst the Ghilji chiefs during these events was Mirwais Hotak – as head of one of the tribes, he was intelligent, well mannered, and one of the richest and most influential people in Kandahar. Hotak signed a petition to Husayn, and boosted the morale of his countrymen for a future revolt if necessary. After the petition failed, Mirwais advocated submission to the Safavids for the time being.

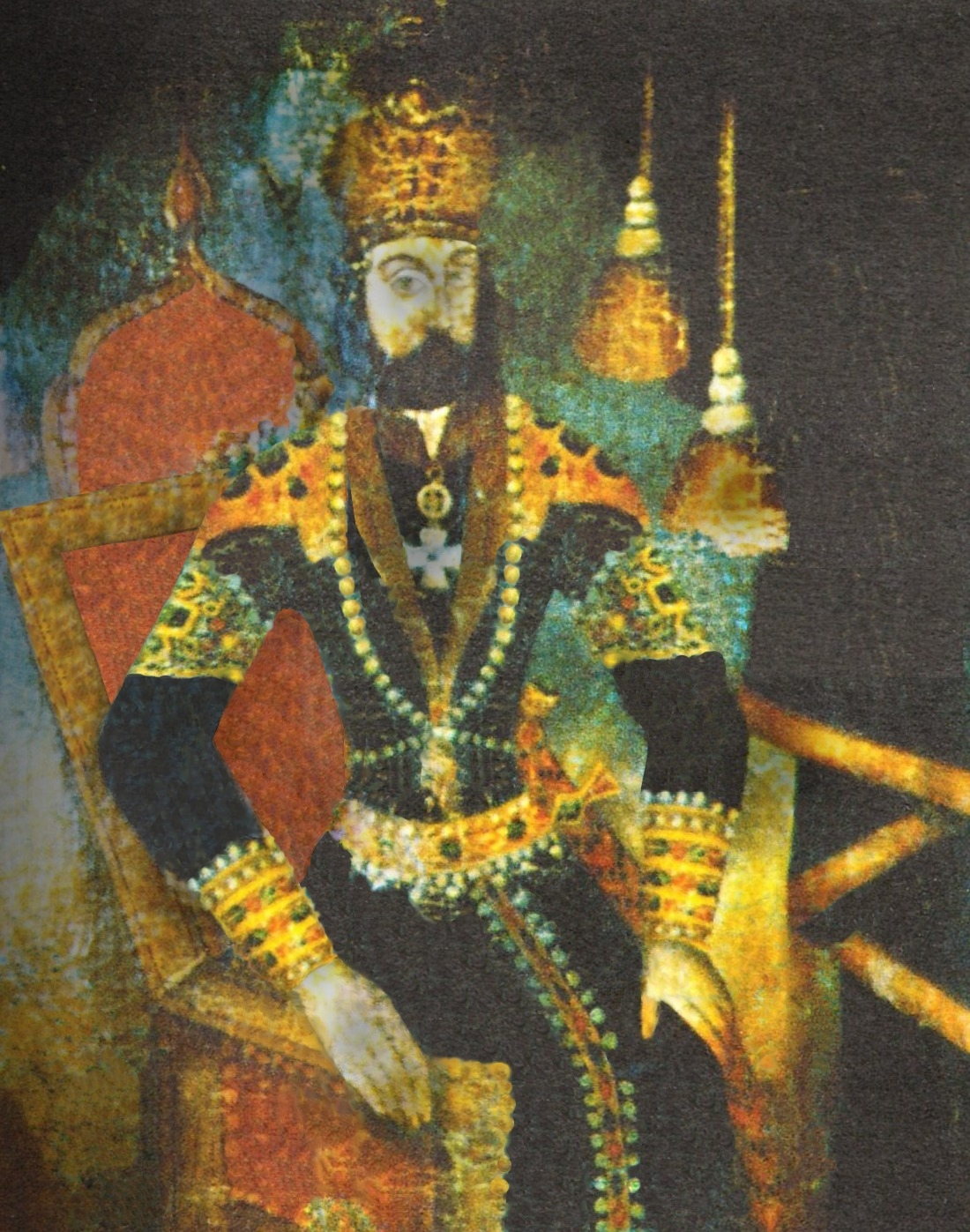
George XI of Kartli

George noticed Hotak's great influence in the Kandahar region, and viewed him as the only thing keeping the Ghilji from revolting in Kandahar. He was determined to strip Hotak of his influence and power, and ordered his arrest for conspiring against the government. Hotak was arrested along with many other compatriots and sent to Isfahan. George, feeling safe in his governorship of Kandahar, allowed the larger part of his army to return to Persia. Hotak arrived at Isfahan, and appealed to the officials in the Persian court, and portrayed George as an enemy to them. He also demanded that Husayn investigate the charges against him, who acknowledged he was innocent and allowed him to retain his influential position at the court.

Hotak explained to the court that George would be a ferocious enemy if he rebelled, with the governorship of Kandahar, Georgia, and Kerman falling to his rule in such a scenario. He talked about George's power, and Husayn saw the possibility of Ghurghis's ambitions growing too big. Having achieved his goal, Hotak requested a pilgrimage to Mecca, which the court could not decline, and was granted permission. He wanted to obtain support and approval from religious leaders, so he asked two questions:

- "Is it lawful for Muslamans to take up arms to free themselves from the yoke?"
- "In the case of which the chief men of several tribes having been forced to take the oath of allegiance to a sovereign who was a heretic, are not the members of the tribe released from the oath when the sovereign ceases to observe the convention he had sworn to?"

The replies were in the affirmative, so Hotak returned to Isfahan. He planned to depart to Kandahar, but decided to remain in the court of Isfahan to avoid arousing suspicion.

Around the same time that Mirwais returned from Mecca, he learned of an Armenian named Israel Ori, sent to Isfahan as an ambassador under diplomatic authority of Peter the Great. The ambassador had hundreds of followers supporting him to move toward the court. His goal was more influence over Persian import and export duties, and the story was expanded upon and greatly exaggerated. When it reached the court at Isfahan, many rumors added to the alarm, and Husayn had asked Hotak for counsel, who replied:

It is true that the conjuncture is formidable. If the Tsar of Russia had desired to send a peaceful mission to this country, he would not have selected an Armenian as his agent. By sending a man, born a Persian subject, yet of his own faith, and of the ancient royal family of Armenia, his object must be to blow with effect the coals of sedition into the very heart of the kingdom. But, the efforts of Armenia backed by Russia, would mean nothing, could we be sure of Georgia. But it is only recently that the Georgians, under Ghurghis Khan, revolted against the Shah. We know that the cousin of Ghurghis Khan is now at the court of St Petersburg. How can we doubt that as soon as this Armenian Christian has penetrated with his following into Persia, backed by Russia, Ghurghis Khan, who was once a Christian, who is probably a Christian in heart now, who is, moreover, the lineal descent of descendant of the ancient kings of Georgia, who can doubt but that he will turn Georgia, Kerman, and Kandahar against us, and strike a blow at the heart of the empire.

The arguments sent Husayn into a panic. In fear of provoking Russia, he allowed Israel Ori to travel to Isfahan, and suspicion of George plagued both the court and the Shah. As a result, Husayn reappointed Hotak to his position to spy on George, and by any means, remove him from power if he was thought to have started anything suspicious. Hotak returned to Kandahar, enraging George, who had to appoint him back to his positions. George demanded that Hotak hand over his daughter to be his concubine. Hotak, insulted, communicated with the heads of other tribes in his tent and consulted on plans for rebellion. Mirwais asked the tribes to follow him, and they waited for him to give the signal.

Hotak disguised a young-looking girl and dressed her to take the place of his daughter and sent her to George. Hotak was ready to rebel, but he had one obstacle in his way: When Gurgin Khan allowed the Persians to return to Persia, he kept the Georgians of the army as his bodyguards. Hotak informed the Tarins – tribal governors of the Pishin Valley – to stop paying tribute to George, who dispatched the majority of his Georgian troops to the region. Meanwhile, Hotak arranged members of the branch of the Ghilji tribe, with him being the chief and marched out to approach within a few miles of Kandahar. Hotak then invited the marching Georgians, including George, to a banquet, expressing his distaste for the Tarins' behaviour.

George, not suspecting treachery, was slain. Hotak ordered George and his men stripped, and he and his allies wore their armor and set out for Kandahar, their appearance preventing suspicion. They entered the gates and attacked the Georgian army, cutting down the guards and admitting the awaiting Afghans from the rear.

== Hotak dynasty ==
With the coup succeeding, Hotak assembled the inhabitants of Kandahar and made a speech about how the loss of George had weakened Persia, and the opportunity for freedom and liberty was now available to Afghans. Mirwais said:

If there are any amongst you, who have not the courage to enjoy this precious gift of liberty now dropped down to you from heaven, let him declare himself; no harm shall be done to him, he shall be permitted to go in search of some new tyrant beyond the frontier of this happy state.

Every Afghan hearing the speech felt inspired to defend the liberty granted to them. Hotak then assembled leading men of the different tribes and presented the situation to them: the Persians would likely send a punitive expedition. Hotak was given complete executive power, armed his forces, and spread word of his successes to other tribes to encourage them to join the revolt.

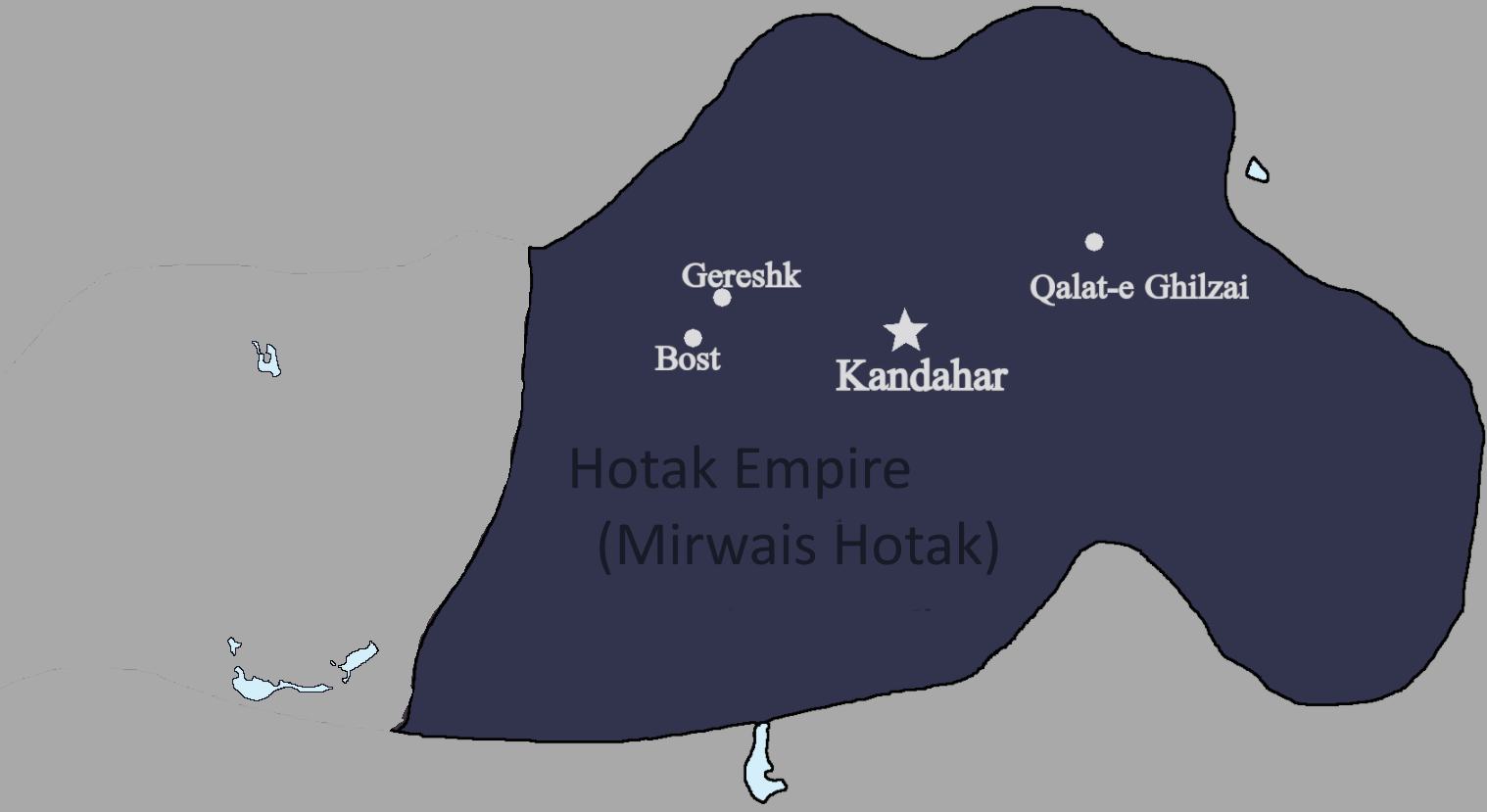
Map of the Hotak dynasty 1715

On the fourth day after George's death, the rest of the Georgian dispatch returned from their campaign to suppress the Tarins, numbering around 600 disciplined Georgian men. Hotak allowed them to approach within range of musket shot fire, then directed the guns to open up on the Georgian army. He opened up another gate with over 5,000 cavalrymen to cut off the Georgian retreat; 600 Georgians managed to breach through the cavalry. Hotak pursued the Georgian army for days; though repelled, he inflicted heavy casualties on them.

The retreating Georgians carried news of the revolution at Kandahar. The Persian court tried to solve the issue diplomatically due to fear of the Hotaks calling in the Mughal Empire. They sent an ambassador, Jani Khan, to assure Hotak that George's death would be forgiven if they allowed a Persian garrison in Kandahar. Hotak imprisoned him to stall for time and delay Persia's preparations by refusing to answer the court. After hearing nothing from Jani Khan, the Persian court sent another ambassador, Muhammad Khan, to Kandahar. He was informed that he should "never make base proposals to men who are free". When the ambassador returned, the Persian court realized that war was the only option to subdue Hotak and his followers.

=== Clashes with the Persian army ===
In 1710, the Persians dispatched a force under Muhammad Khan to go to Kandahar and quell the rebellion. Hotak, hearing that the army was mostly made up of Persians, advanced with over 5,000 cavalrymen and defeated the Persian army. Over 18 months, the Persians dispatched four more armies, but each was defeated. On the last attempt, the Persians advanced with over 5,000 men, commanded by Mahammad Khan, and was repelled by the 500-man Afghan army, with the Persians suffering over 1,000 killed and wounded. Amongst the prisoners from the battle was Mahammad Khan and his three sons. In the wake of these defeats, the Persian court focused all the imperial resources of the Persian empire on Hotak. George's nephew Khusru Khan marched with a large Persian army to Kandahar against Hotak. Khusru scouted ahead after advancing to Farah, and Mirwais took positions near Ghirisk on the banks of the Helmand River, leaving the passes unguarded. Khusru led his army of 42,000 through the pass where he met Hotak and his army. The Afghans, inferior in numbers, were defeated by Khusru, and with this victory, Khusru marched on to Kandahar. He demanded that Kandahar surrender to him, but the Afghans resisted. Hotak hastened to the south of Kandahar and mobilized a force of Balochs and Tarins to march toward Kandahar. He cut off enemy supply lines, laid waste to the land around Kandahar, and threatened enemy communications. Khusru tried to prolong the siege as long as he could, but he lost two-thirds of his force to scorched earth tactics and enemy counterattacks. Khusru called for a retreat, but Hotak advanced. The Persian army was destroyed and Khusru was killed.

=== Subsequent Persian failed expeditions ===
In late 1712, the qorchibashi (head of the mounted cavalry or royal guards) Mohammad Zaman Khan was entrusted with the task of attacking the Afghans whilst assembling an army en route. However, the lack of funds greatly hindered his expedition. Rather than using money from his own treasury, Soltan Hoseyn forced the merchants in Isfahan and New Jolfa to give a combined amount of 14,000 tomans. The expedition eventually fell apart when Zaman Khan died near Herat in the spring of 1712.

He was succeeded by Mansur Khan Shahsevan, whose expedition also ended in failure. He left Isfahan in September 1713 with fifty troops and more or less without any funds. Meanwhile, Sultan Husayn had forced his courtiers to lend him money to construct a new maydan (town square) in Farahabad. During the summer of 1713, 500 soldiers were marching towards the east, with no funds and horses and equipped with sticks. Mahd Ali Khan, who governed Farah, was unable to march towards with his 1,500 soldiers towards Mirwais due to lack of funds. Many of his soldiers had deserted and made the countryside dangerous.

== Death and legacy ==
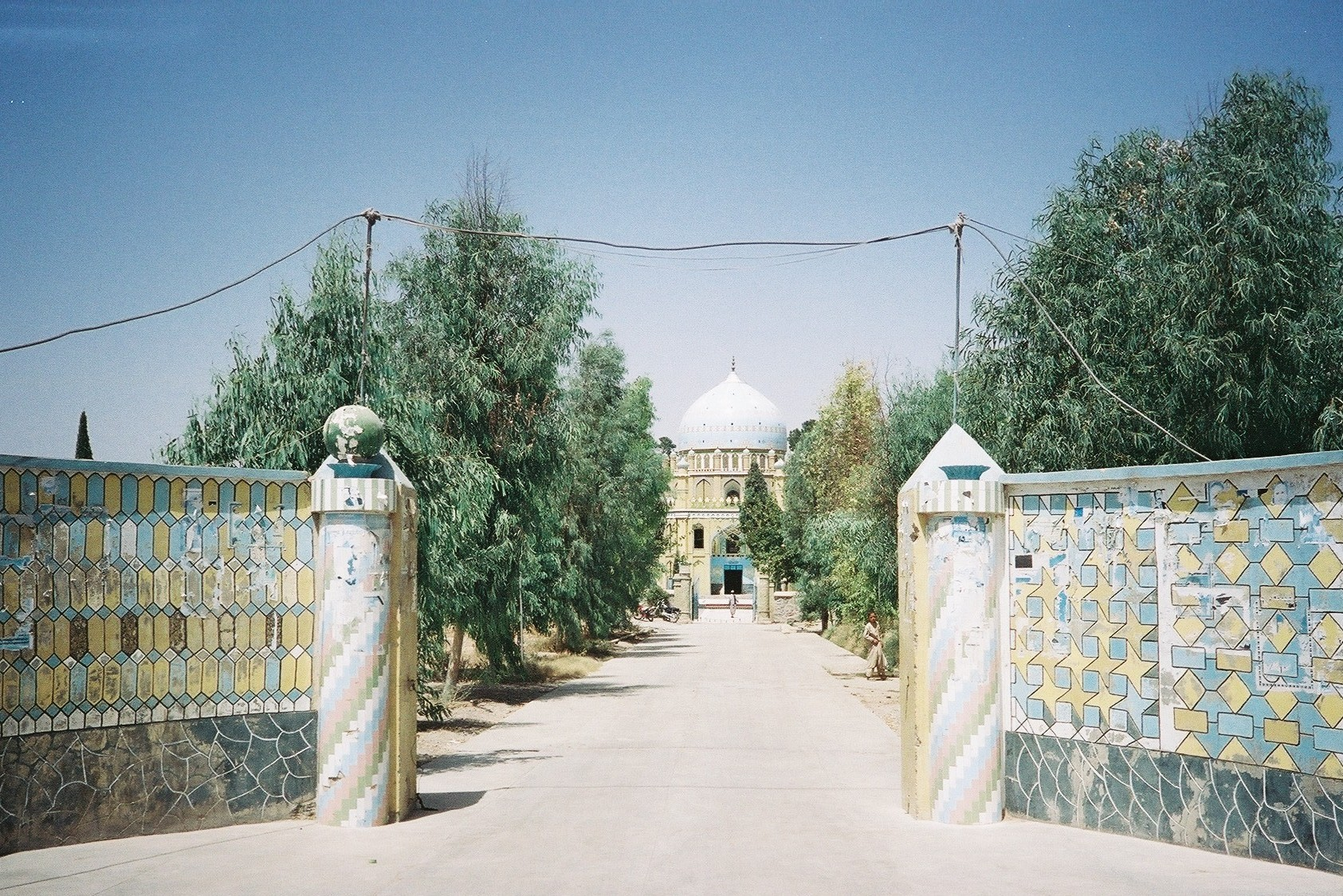
The mausoleum of Mirwais Hotak in the Kokaran section of Kandahar, Afghanistan

Hotak remained in power until his death in November 1715 and was succeeded by his brother Abdul Aziz, who was later killed by Hotak's son Mahmud, allegedly for planning to give Kandahar's sovereignty back to Persia. In 1717, Mahmud exploited Husayn's political weakness and briefly conquered large parts of Persia.

Hotak is buried in his mausoleum in the Kokaran section of Kandahar. He is regarded as one of Afghanistan's greatest national heroes and admired by many Afghans, especially the Pashtuns. Steven Otfinoski referred to him as Afghanistan's George Washington in his 2004 book Afghanistan.

== See also ==
- History of Afghanistan
- Safavid conversion of Iran to Shia Islam

== Notes ==
Political offices
| Preceded by Gurgin Khan | Emir of Afghanistan; April 1709 – November 1715 | Succeeded by Abdul Aziz Hotak |
