= Siege of Isfahan =

1722 Hotaki siege in Iran

- Part of Afghan Rebellions of 1709–1726
Date	8 March – 23 October 1722
Location	Isfahan, Central Persia
Result	Hotaki victory

Belligerents
Hotak dynasty	Safavid Iran

Commanders and leaders
Mahmud Hotak	Sultan Husayn (surrendered)

Strength
Unknown	Unknown

Casualties and losses
Unknown	Unknown
- 80,000 civilians killed in siege

The siege of Isfahan (Persian: سقوط اصفهان) was a six-month-long siege of Isfahan, the capital of the Safavid dynasty of Iran, by the Hotaki-led Afghan army. It lasted from March to October 1722 and resulted in the city's fall and the beginning of the end of the Safavid dynasty.

== Background ==
The Iranian Safavid Empire, once a powerful empire, had been in decline since the late 17th century. This was brought about by the lack of interest in ruling by many of the Shahs of that period, royal intrigues, civil unrest, especially among many of its subjects, and recurrent wars with their Ottoman arch rivals.

Some subjects such as Mir Wais Hotak, a well-respected tribe leader, attempted to inform Shah Sultan Hussayn of the risks that a lack of strong leadership could cause for the empire. However, this displeased the Safavid political elite, who were content in their position of power and did not wish to see change in the system. Hotak was sent to be imprisoned in Isfahan by Gurgin Khan the governor of Georgia, but used this opportunity to get closer to the Shah and convince him to send him back to Kandahar. Once there, he strategically befriended Gurgin Khan and eventually murdered him, leading to a series of revolts in the region.

The Safavids, at that time being strongly in favor of Shia Islam, heavily oppressed the Sunni Pashtuns in what is now Afghanistan. Making use of the opportunity provided by the Safavid decline, the Pashtuns led by Mir Wais Hotak had rebelled against the Persian overlordship. A series of ensuing punitive campaigns sent by the Safavid government were defeated. However, Mir Wais Hotak was captured and imprisoned. He eventually died in 1715, and soon after his death, his son Mahmud Hotak took over his battle and led the Pashtun army to the capital of the empire Isfahan in 1722.

== Siege ==
Isfahan was besieged by the Afghan forces led by Shah Mahmud Hotaki after their decisive victory over the Safavid army at the battle of Gulnabad, close to Isfahan, on 8 March 1722. While the exact number of soldiers who fought in this battle is unclear, Mahmud Hotak was estimated to have about 18,000 troops, while the Persian army counted around 40,000. After the battle, the Safavid forces fell back in disarray to Isfahan. This defeat would eventually cause the end of the Safavid empire, as Afghan troops approached the capital. The Afghans lacked artillery to breach the city walls and blockaded Isfahan in order to subdue Shah Sultan Husayn Safavi, and the city's defenders into surrender. Ill-organized Safavid efforts to relieve the siege failed and the shah's disillusioned Georgian vassal, Vakhtang VI, refused to come to the Safavids' aid. Shah Husayn's son, Tahmasp, and some 600 soldiers fled their way out of the city in order to release a relief army. However, after 8 months famine prevailed and the shah capitulated on 23 October, abdicating in favor of Mahmud, who triumphantly entered the city on 25 October 1722. The Afghans would remain in Persia until 1729.

== Aftermath ==
After the battle of Gulnabad in 1722 and until 1729, political control shifted from the Safavid dynasty to the succession of rule by the Ghilza'i Afghan Mahmud, followed by his cousin Ashraf. Most of the Safavi princes, as well as the Shah Sultan Husayn, were executed under the Ghilza supremacy. During that time, this political crisis motivated the Russian and Ottoman empire to declare war and conquer important Persian territories. Former Safavi-governed land in the Gilan and Azarbayjan area and in the Kurdish and Luristan territory were acquisitioned by both empires with the Treaty of Constantinople in 1724. This treaty was actually a settlement to avoid a potential war break-out, as the two empires wanted control of the north of Iran. Indeed, Russia's Peter I had plans to build a trade route to India through the countries east of the Caspian Sea, while the Ottomans wanted Russia to stay away from that area due to its close proximity to Turkey. Ashraf wanted full sovereignty over Iran. To do so, in 1727, he made an arrangement to incorporate western Iran into the Ottoman empire; in exchange, they recognized him as ruler.

In 1729, the Persian military, under the rule of Shah Tahmasp II, son of ousted Shah Sultan Husayn, and his general Tahmasp Qoli Khan (later known as Nader Shah), defeated the Afghan army in Khorasan in a quest to restore Safafid domains, and Ashraf was killed. This led to a series of victorious battles by the Safavids under brilliant military commandment by Nader. This concluded Afghan rule in 1730, followed by the restoration of the former Safavid political-economic system under Tahmasp II. Nader was proclaimed shah in 1736 after deposing the newly appointed shah, Abbas III, son of Tahmasp II. Now ruler of Persia, he set to conquer India, with the opening Battle of Karnal in 1739. In 1743, he went to war for the second time against the Ottoman Empire, which lasted until 1746. Nader Shah was assassinated by his own troops in 1747 while trying to dissolute an uprising against him in Khorasan.

== See also ==
- Battle of Damghan (1729)
- Ottoman–Persian Wars
- Peter the Great's capture of Rasht
- Military of the Afsharid dynasty of Persia
- Restoration of Tahmasp II to the Safavid throne
- Battle of Khwar Pass
- Hotaki dynasty

== Sources ==
Axworthy, Michael (2006). The Sword of Persia: Nader Shah, from Tribal Warrior to Conquering Tyrant. I.B. Tauris. ISBN 1-85043-706-8.
