= Farahabad (Isfahan) =

Historic site in Isfahan, Iran

Farahabad (Persian: فرح‌آباد) was a Safavid era palace complex located outside the city wall of Isfahan. It was constructed under the orders of Shah Soltan Hoseyn (r. 1694–1722) during the later part of his reign. It was razed by the Afghans in 1727, the same year that Soltan Hoseyn died.

== Sources ==
- Kleiss, Wolfram (1999). "Faraḥābād". Encyclopaedia Iranica.
- Matthee, Rudi (2011). Persia in Crisis: Safavid Decline and the Fall of Isfahan. I.B.Tauris. ISBN 978-0857731814.
- Matthee, Rudi (2015). "Solṭān Ḥosayn". Encyclopaedia Iranica.
