= Hussain Hotak =

Shah Hussain Hotak شاه حسين هوتک
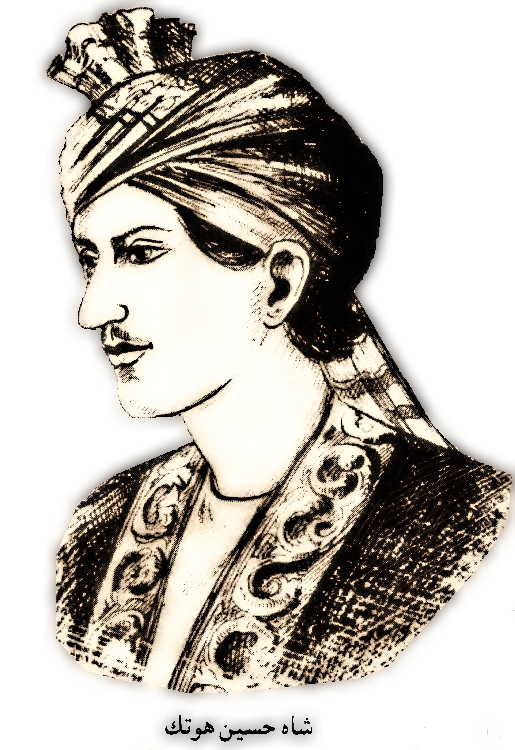
- Imaginary depiction of Shah Hussain

Emir of Afghanistan
- Reign: 22 April 1725 – 25 March 1738
- Coronation: 1725
- Predecessor: Mahmud Hotak
- Successor: Position abolished
- Born: Kandahar, Hotak Emirate
- Died: after 25 March 1738; Mazandaran, Afsharid Iran
- Burial: Kandahar
Names
- Hussain Hotak
- Dynasty: Hotak dynasty
- Father: Mirwais Hotak
- Religion: Sunni Islam

Shah Hussain Hotak (Pashto/Dari: شاه حسين هوتک; died after 25 March 1738) was the fifth and last ruler of the Ghilji Hotak dynasty. An ethnic Pashtun (Afghan) from the Ghilji tribe, he succeeded to the throne in 1725 following the death of his brother Mahmud Hotak at the hands of their cousin Ashraf Hotak. He was also a Pashto poet. While his cousin Ashraf ruled most of Persia from Isfahan, Hussain governed Kandahar. He was defeated by Nader Shah in 1738 and subsequently deported to Mazandaran, where he is presumed to have died in exile.

Ashraf's death in 1729 marked the end of the brief Hotak rule in Persia (Iran), but Kandahar remained under Hussain's control until 1738, when Nader Shah captured the city. This marked only a temporary interruption before the founding of the last Afghan Empire in 1747.

== See also ==
- Hotak dynasty
- History of Afghanistan
- Siege of Kandahar

Hussain Hotak Hotak dynasty
Preceded by Mahmud Hotak	Emir of Afghanistan; 1725–1738	Succeeded by Position abolished
