= Pishin Valley =

Valley in Balochistan, Pakistan

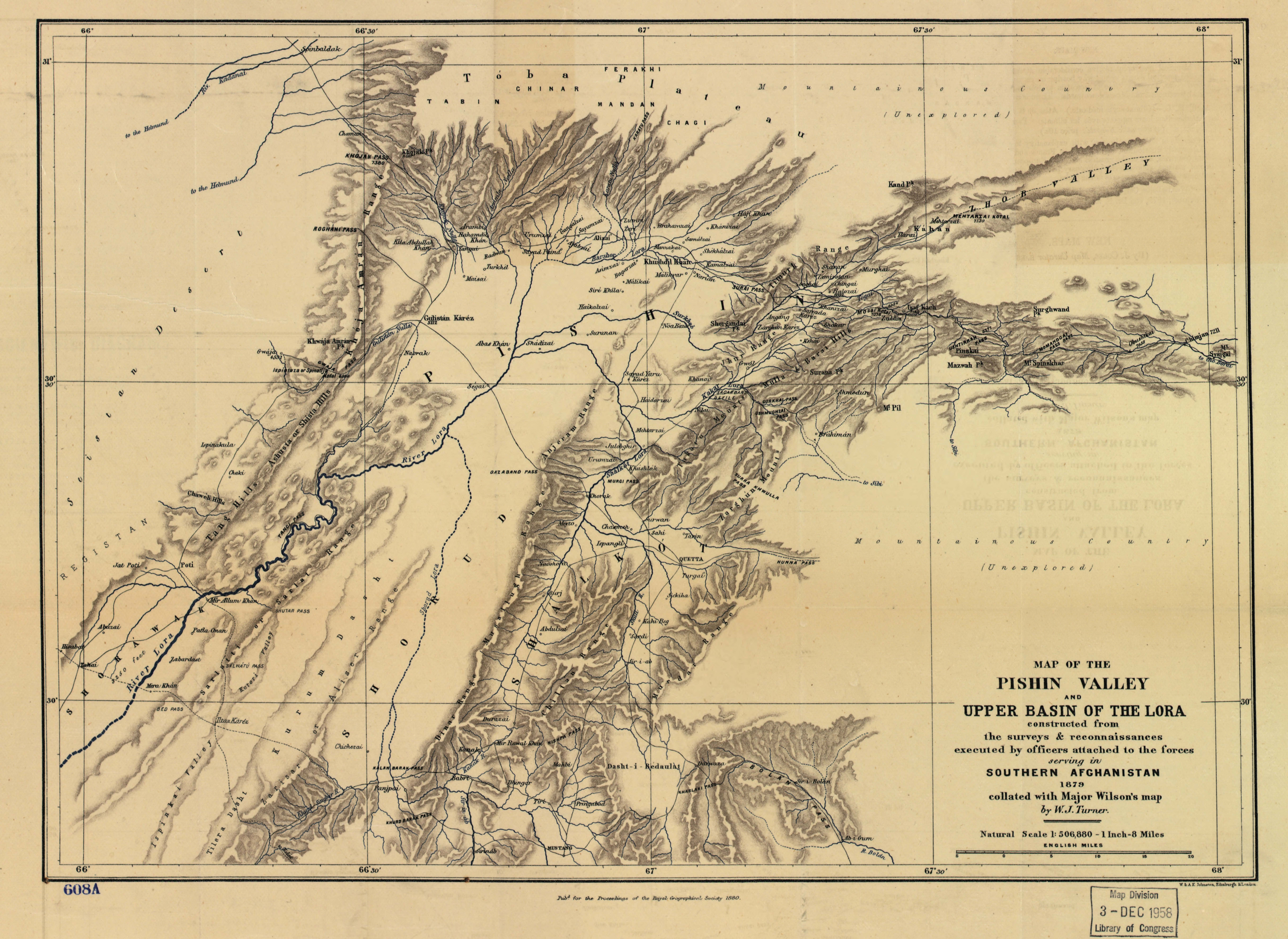
Map of Pishin Valley, 1880

The Pishin Valley (Urdu: وادی پشین) is located in Pishin District, Balochistan, Pakistan. It is located 50km away from the provincial capital - Quetta, and is filled with numerous orchards.
