= Jonas Otter =

Swedish traveler

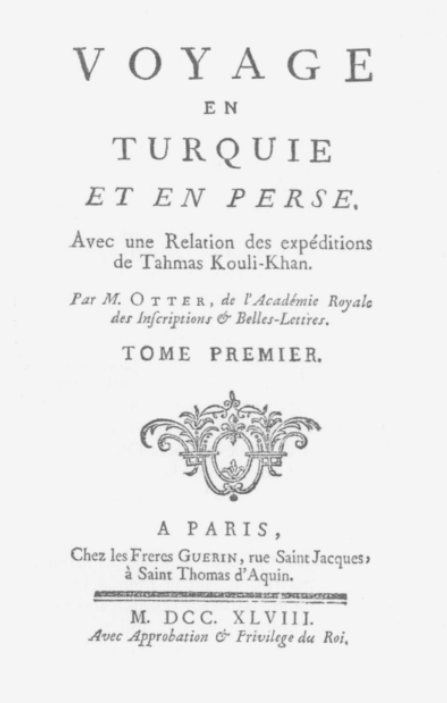
Title page of Voyage en Turquie et en Perse

Jonas (Jean) Otter (October 1707 in Kristianstad, Sweden – September 1748 in Paris) was a Swedish traveler in the Ottoman and Persian Empires, known for his book Voyage en Turquie et en Perse, avec une Relation des Expeditions de Tahmas-Kouli-Khan (1748), based on his ten years in the Middle East.

Otter studied languages, physics, and theology at Lund University under Andreas Rydelius, the Lutheran bishop of Lund, but interrupted his studies and left for Stockholm. In 1728, he converted to Catholicism, and left for Rouen, where he studied at the seminary until 1731, and learned English, Spanish, and Italian. He then left for Paris and worked at the Post Office.

In January 1734, the Count of Maurepas sent him to Constantinople, where he stayed with the French Minister, Villeneuve, to study Arabic and Turkish. He also became acquainted with the Ottoman official and publisher Ibrahim Muteferrika and the Ottoman governor of Baghdad, Ahmad Pasha.

Starting in 1736, he traveled to Persia, notably Isfahan and Basra, and he was named French Consul at Basra in 1742.

By the time he returned to Paris in 1744, he was very knowledgeable about Arabic, Persian, Sanskrit, and Turkish, and he worked as a translator at the Bibliothèque du roi, translating many historical manuscripts in those languages.

In 1746, he was named Professor of Arabic Language at the Collège Royal and in 1748, was elected a member of the Académie Royale des Inscriptions et Belles-Lettres.

In 1748, his book Voyage en Turquie et en Perse was published in Paris; it was later translated into German. It reported on Isfahan, Baghdad, Mosul, and Basra.

He died in 1748.

== Bibliography ==
- Bahram Sohrabi, "Early Swedish Travelers to Persia", Iranian Studies 38:4:631-660 (December 2005), JSTOR 4311767, pp. 639–642
