= Mahmud Hotak =

Hotak ruler of Iran from 1722 to 1725

Mahmud Hotak محمود شاه هوتک
- Shah; Emir; The Conqueror
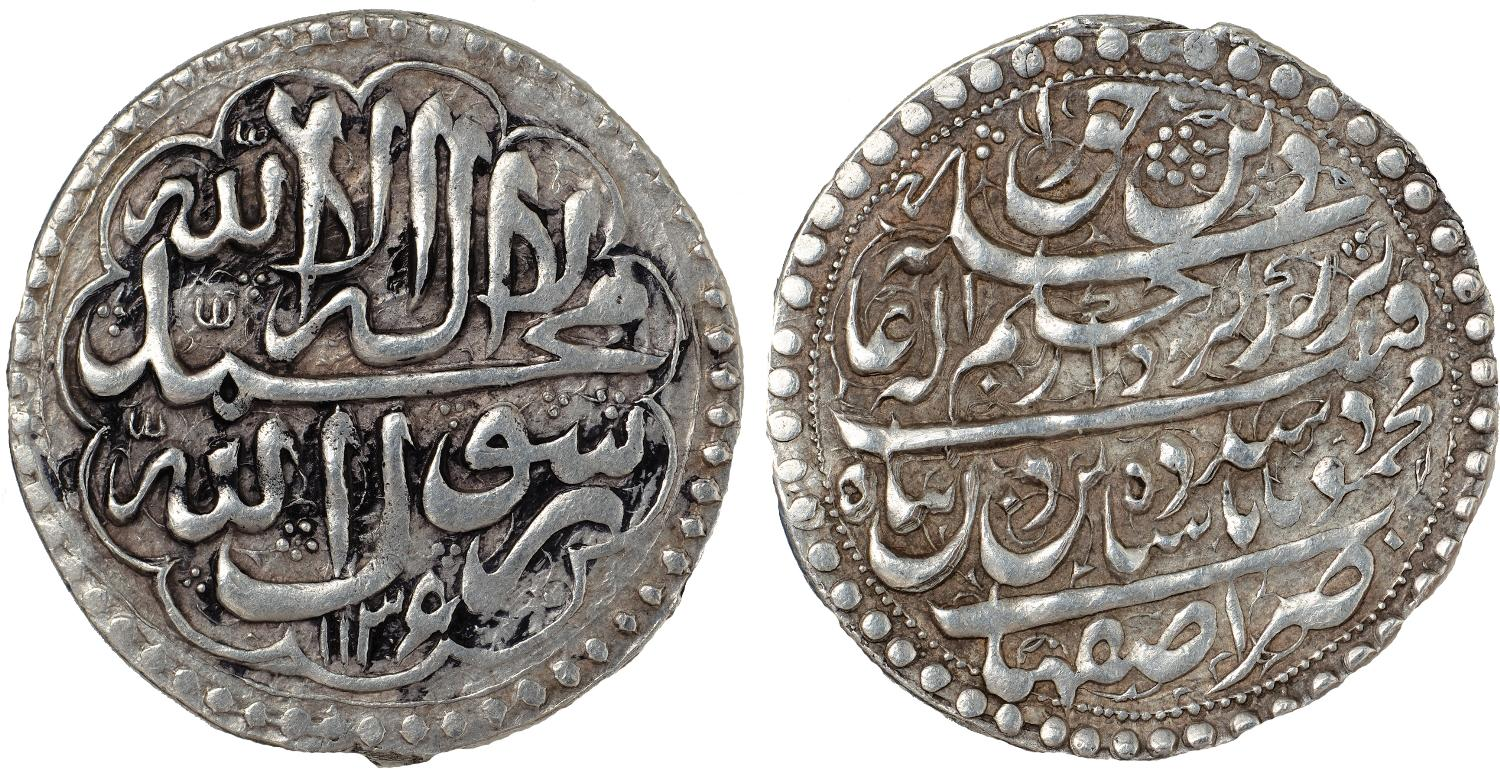
- Coin of Mahmud; Isfahan mint, 1723

Emir of Afghanistan
- Reign: 1717 – 22 April 1725
- Coronation: 1717, Kandahar
- Predecessor: Abdul Aziz Hotak
- Successor: Hussain Hotak

Shah of Iran
- Reign: 23 October 1722 – 22 April 1725
- Coronation: 23 October 1722, Isfahan
- Predecessor: Soltan Hoseyn
- Successor: Ashraf Hotak
- Born: 1697; Kandahar, Safavid Iran
- Died: April 22, 1725 (age 27); Isfahan, Hotak Iran
- Spouse: Shahbanu Alamiyan; Govhar Sultan Safavi
Names
- Mir Mahmud Shah Hotak
- House: Hotak
- Father: Mirwais Hotak
- Mother: Khanzada Sadozai
- Religion: Sunni Islam (Hanafi)
- Military career
- Conflicts: Battle of Dilaram; Battle of Gulnabad; Capture of Julfa; Siege of Isfahan; Battle of Golpayegan; Siege of Shiraz

Shāh Mahmūd Hotak, (Pashto/Dari: شاه محمود هوتک) or Shāh Mahmūd Ghiljī (شاه محمود غلجي) (1697 – April 22, 1725), also known by his epithet, The Conqueror, was the ruler of the Hotak dynasty who overthrew the Safavid dynasty to become the king of Persia from 1722 until his death in 1725.

== Early life (1697–1715) ==
Mahmud was the eldest son of Mirwais Hotak, the chief of the Ghilji Pashtun tribe of Afghanistan, who had made the Kandahar region independent from Safavid rule in 1709.

=== Reign of Abdul Aziz Hotak and coup (1715–1717) ===
Upon the death of Mirwais in 1715, he was succeeded by his brother, Abdul Aziz. Abdul Aziz sided with the Persians and re-entered the suzerainty of Safavid Iran, which proved unpopular with his fellow Afghans. Mahmud, seeing that his father Mirwais Hotak's achievements would be undone, assembled many of his father's loyal followers, and entered the royal palace. Mahmud Hotak himself killed Abdul Aziz, and ascended the throne of the Hotaks at the age of 18.

== Rule (1717–1725) ==
=== Campaigns against Iran (1720–1725) ===
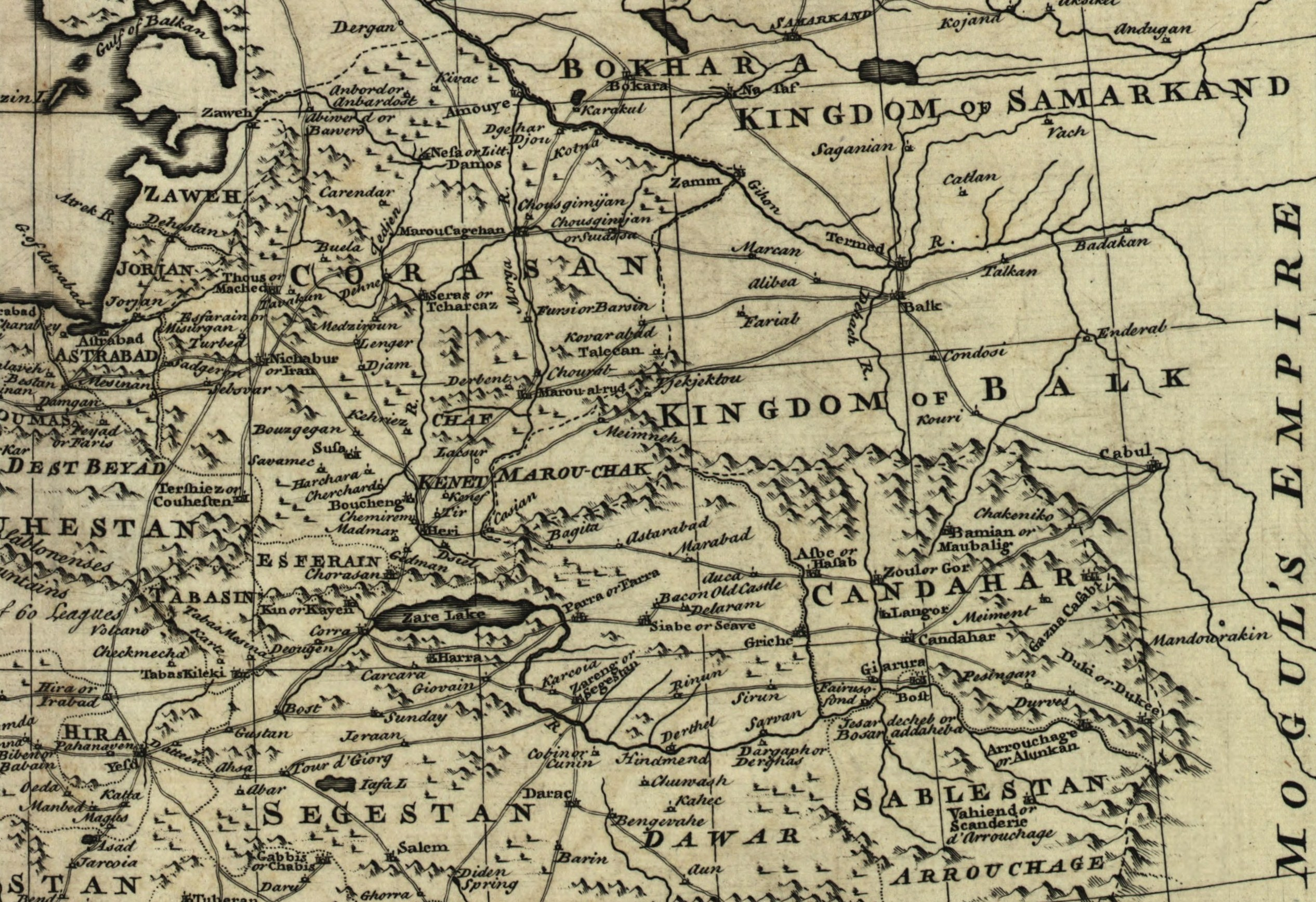
The Abdali Pashtuns inhabited the region of Khorasan while the Ghiljis controlled the Kandahar region (Candahar) to the southeast.

Mahmud Hotak, ambitious and wishing to expand his territories, began to wage war against the Safavids. His first campaign was in 1720, where he besieged Kerman. After defeating his neighbor, Sadozai Sultanate of Herat in battle in 1720, he began preparing for a campaign again against the Safavids. The Ghilzais easily conquered the Kirman town but failed to take its citadel on October 1721, due to inexperience, Mahmud faced a loss of one thousand five hundred men. By the end of January 1722, the Ghilzais were unfamiliar with siege tactics, which lead to them murmuring and some even leaving to Kandahar. To Mahmud Hotak's favour, Rustam Muhammad Sa'dlū passed away by this point in time. In 1722, Mahmud assembled 20,000 men and began advancing on Isfahan. He encountered Kirman yet again at the unwelcoming sight of re-inforced defenses outside the city, and failed to capture it. He bypassed it and was again fended off near Yazd by the garrison there, prompting him to march directly on Isfahan, something that caught the Safavids off guard. The Persians and Afghans met in the Battle of Gulnabad on 8 March 1722. Despite being outnumbered, and poorly equipped in comparison, the Afghans routed the Persian army, and advanced on Isfahan. The Afghans besieged Isfahan, starting with the Capture of Julfa. Mahmud and his army lacked siege equipment, and as a result, the siege of the city lasted for months, not ending until 23 October 1722. It is believed that during the siege, over 80,000 of its inhabitants died. The townspeople were reduced to eating horses, and in some extreme cases, other humans at one point. The Safavid Shah of Iran Soltan Hoseyn, accompanied by his courtiers and officers, went to Farahabad, where the Afghans were encamped. Sultan Hoseyn removed his crown and placed it on the turban of Mahmud, officially now reigning as Shah.

After the siege, he made an agreement with a Safavid official and general named Malek Mahmud to grant him control over Mashhad as a Hotaki ally, however Malek's defeat later on in 1726 would herald the disaster that would soon unfold on the Hotaki dynasty.

=== Reign as Shah (1722–1725) ===
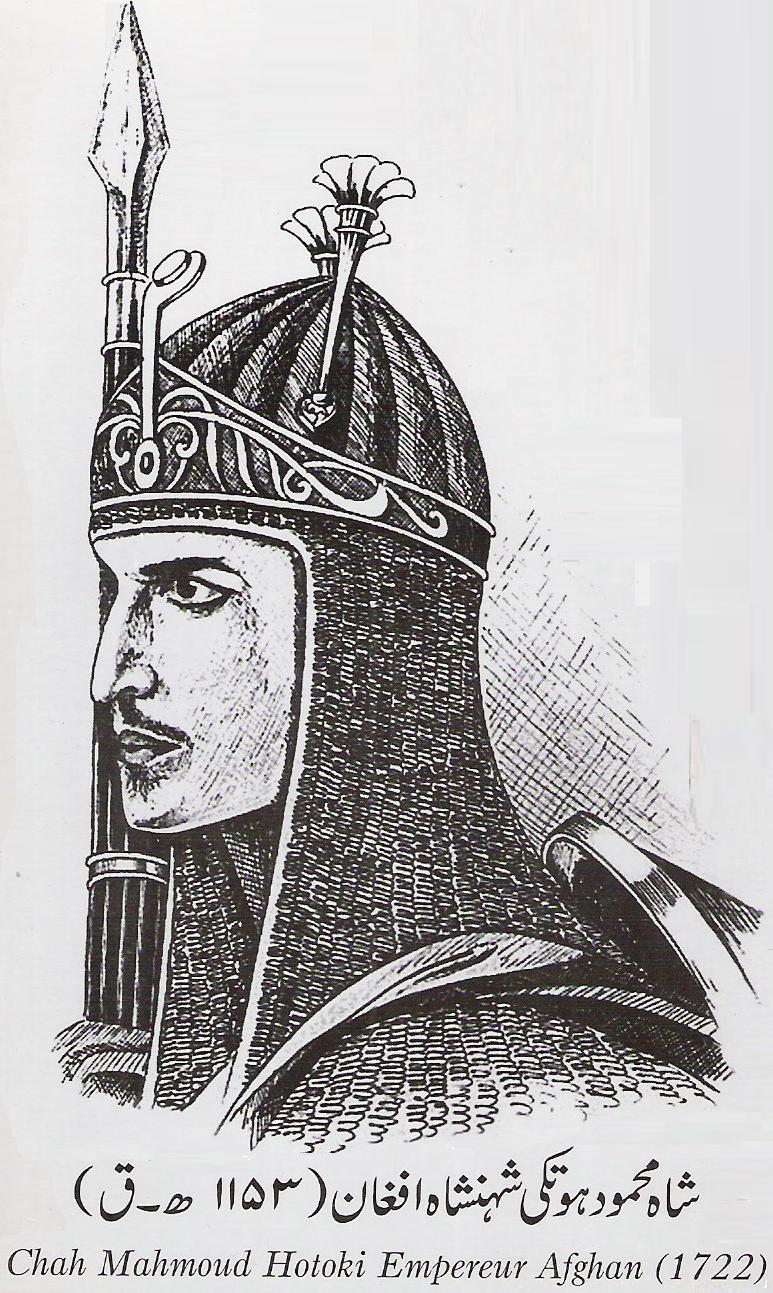
Imaginary depiction of Mahmud Shah

In the very early days of his rule, Mahmud displayed benevolence, treating the captured royal family well and bringing in food supplies to the starving capital, and this conflated with military success in seizing Shiraz as well as the two southernly towns of Golpeyagan and Kashan. Performatively, Mahmud also confiscated the land owned by Seyyed Abdollah who betrayed the Persians by retreating in the middle of the field at Gulnabad.

But he was confronted with a rival claimant to the throne when Hosein's son, Tahmasp declared himself shah in November. Mahmud sent an army against Tahmasp's base, Qazvin. Tahmasp escaped and the Pashtuns took the city but, shocked at the treatment they received at the hands of the conquering army, the population rose up against them in January 1723. The revolt was a success and Mahmud was worried about the reaction when the surviving Pashtuns returned to Isfahan to bring news of the defeat. Suffering from mental illnesses and fearing a revolt by his subjects, Mahmud invited his Persian ministers and nobles to a meeting under false pretence and had them slaughtered. He also executed up to 3,000 of the Persian royal guards. At the same time the Persian arch rivals, the Ottomans, and the Russians took advantage of the chaos in Persia to seize land for themselves, reducing the territory under Mahmud's control.

His failure to impose his rule across Persia made Mahmud depressed and suspicious. He was also concerned about the loyalty of his own men, since many Pashtun tribes preferred his cousin Ashraf Khan. In February 1725, believing a rumour that one of Soltan Hoseyn's sons, Safi Mirza, had escaped, Mahmud ordered the execution of all the other Safavid princes who were in his hands, with the exception of Soltan Hoseyn himself. When Soltan Hoseyn tried to stop the massacre, he was wounded, but his action led to Mahmud sparing the lives of two of his young children.

Mahmud's mental illness was exacerbated by consistent failures to assert control over the people of Persia; his forces again failed to besiege Yazd and a Hotaki army was ambushed south of Isfahan in an expedition to subdue the Kuhgelu tribesmen among the Zagros.

== Death (1725) ==
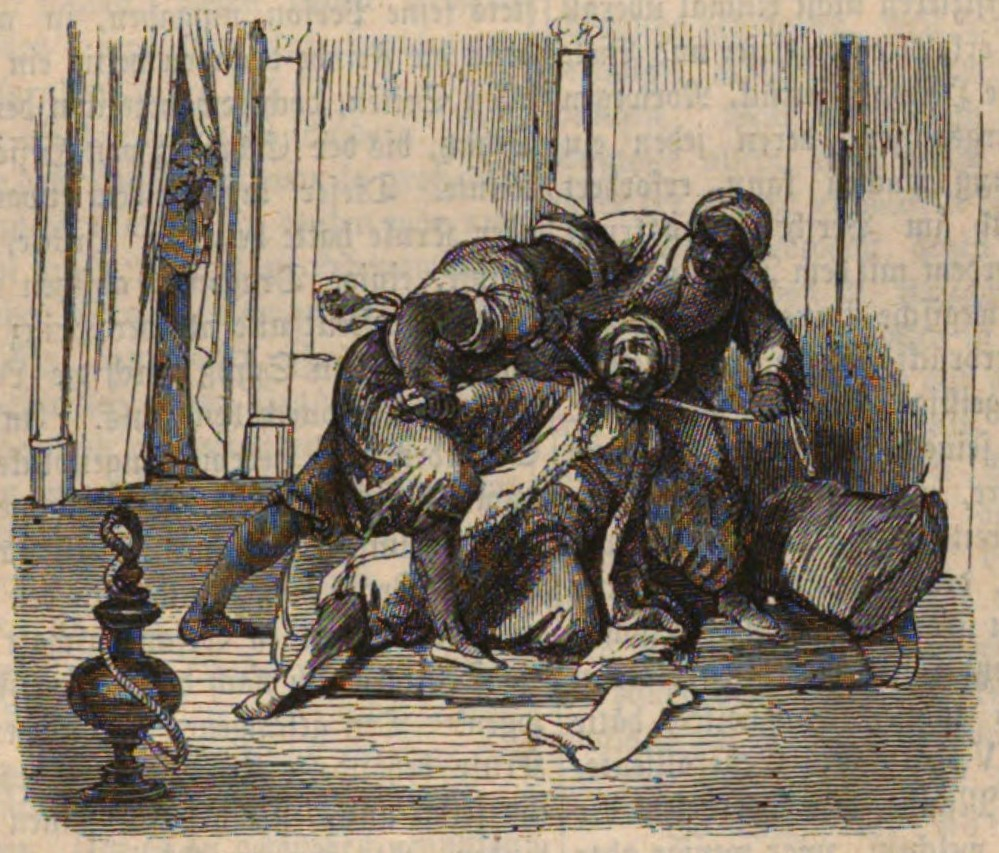
A painting illustrating the moment Mahmud Hotak was assassinated.

Mahmud began to lose his sanity as his physical health deteriorated. He spent 40 days in solitary confinement in a practice called Chilla. This period of time in confinement is meant to control the powers of Jinns. However after he left confinement, numerous illnesses plagued him, such as a deadly parasitic disease, similar to scabies. This isolation was said to have caused his mental derangement, and his body was described as skinny, appearing like a skeleton. Sources describe that when his face was immersed in sunlight, his face appeared pale and his body starving. His staring was also described to show the strain his body went through. As a result, he developed extreme paranoia. Due to extreme itching, he would often tear at his own flesh with his fingernails, and even eating it. On April 22, 1725, a group of Afghan officers freed Ashraf Hotak, his cousin, from the prison where he had been confined by Mahmud and launched a palace coup which placed Ashraf on the throne. Mahmud was assassinated by his cousin. Other sources say he died as a result of his insanity.

...Thereafter his disorder rapidly increased, until he himself was murdered on April 22 by his cousin Ashraf, who was thereupon proclaimed king. Mír Maḥmúd was at the time of his death only twenty-seven years of age, and is described as "middle-sized and clumsy; his neck was so short that his head seemed to grow to his shoulders; he had a broad face and flat nose, and his beard was thin and of a red colour; his looks were wild and his countenance austere and disagreeable; his eyes, which were blue and a little squinting, were generally downcast, like a man absorbed in deep thought."

— Edward G. Browne, 1924

== Administration ==
Numerous high-ranking administrators were slain by Mahmud and Ashraf, who also destroyed the majority of Safavid records. Ruling most of Iran, however, Mahmud began to regret his hasty actions. Ghilji chiefs were not unfamiliar with bureaucratic procedure as they had long served as the kalantars of Kandahar under the Safavids. They therefore sought assistance and rebuilt the central bureaucracy. Mahmud ordered Mirza Sami'a to compose the Tazkerat al-Moluk, a manual for the government that outlined how the nation was administered, who was responsible for paying what taxes, and how much money was paid to which officials for what kinds of duties.

== See also ==
- List of monarchs of Afghanistan
- Hotak dynasty
- Mirwais Hotak
- Abdul Aziz Hotak
- Ashraf Hotak
- Hussain Hotak

== Sources ==
- Axworthy, Michael (2009-02-28). The Sword of Persia: Nader Shah, from Tribal Warrior to Conquering Tyrant. Bloomsbury Academic. ISBN 978-1-84511-982-9.
- Floor, Willem (2018). "Tribal Resurgence in the Eighteenth Century: A Useful Label?". In Axworthy, Michael (ed.). Crisis, Collapse, Militarism and Civil War: The History and Historiography of 18th Century Iran. Oxford University Press. pp. 151–162. ISBN 978-0-19-025033-1.

Mahmud Hotak Hotak dynasty Born: 1697 Died: 1725
Preceded by Abdul Aziz Hotak	Emir of Afghanistan; 1717–1725	Succeeded by Ashraf Khan
Preceded by Soltan Hoseyn	Shah of Persia; 1722–1725	Succeeded by Ashraf Khan
