= Abdul Salam Rocketi =

Former Taliban commander (born 1958)

Mullah Abdul Salam Rocketi (born 1958) is a former mujahideen and Taliban military commander who renounced his allegiance to run for the Parliament of Afghanistan in 2005, and for the Presidency in 2009. The Asia Times described him as one of the former Taliban who "... act as the Taliban's political wing in Kabul." Rocketi is an ethnic Pashtun from Zabul Province in Afghanistan. Son of Haji Manzar, he had almost completed his religious studies before he joined the mujahideen war against the Soviets.

== Soviet invasion of Afghanistan ==
Rocketi was born in Naw Bahar District, Zabul Province. During the Soviet occupation of Afghanistan in the 1980s, Rocketi earned his surname (Rocketi - راکیټی) fighting with rocket-propelled grenades against Soviet helicopters and tanks, and he was soon elected as the main commander in the south zone of Afghanistan in the war against Russian invaders, he was titled Rocketi by his acting commander at that time Amir Mussa Kalim.

== Afghan Civil War ==
In 1995, he was requested to join the Taliban by the leader of Taliban Mullah Omar then he fought against the Mujahedeen. After a long war he was appointed as governor and military head of Maidan Wardak Province, He was also the main commander who took Kabul from the Mujahedeen. A member of the Abdul Rasul Sayyaf's Islamic Dawah Organisation of Afghanistan, his residence was raided by Pakistani militias who uncovered a cache of Stinger missiles, and arrested his brother. Rocketi retaliated, fought against these militias in many battles and won many battles against them. After some time in a battle he lost his brother in a battle against Pakistani and these Pakistani kidnapped his brother body and not welling to give it back after a while Rocketi kidnapped the deputy commissioner of Ziarat, Atta Mohammad, and several Pakistani militiamen. In retaliation, he took 10 Pakistani hostages, including the deputy commissioner of Ziarat and 2 Chinese engineers. He demanded that his brother to be freed from Pakistani prison and return his martyred brother Dawtany and return of his Stinger missiles,

== U.S. invasion of Afghanistan ==
By the time of the 2001 U.S. invasion of Afghanistan, Rocketi was serving as the top commander in Kunar, Nangarhar and Laghman provinces. In the opening days of the bombardment, it was suggested that his residence may have been a target of three bombs dropped in mid-October. However, by December 2001, he was reported to have surrendered Zabul to the American forces. The following month, it was reported that he may have been killed in the attack that also killed Taliban Interior Minister Qari Ahmadullah.

In May 2002, after renouncing the insurgency, Rocketi was arrested by American officials during a meeting in Kandahar.

== Relationship with militant leaders ==
According to the Sydney Morning Herald Rocketi, commenting on a recent Taliban offensive in 2006, said:

They don't have the power to take territory and hold it for a long time. But they can disturb the peace and, day by day, that causes instability ... they can't fight the foreigners for long periods, but they can take on the Afghan military.

In the summer of 2007 Rocketi and Abdul Salam Zaeef, the Taliban's former Ambassador to Pakistan, were reported to have entered into negotiation with the more moderate factions within the Taliban. According to the Asia Times:

An official of a Kabul-based European body that has had a major role in facilitating the talks between the Taliban and coalition forces confirmed to Asia Times Online, on condition of anonymity, that high-level talks between Taliban commanders and coalition forces through Rocketi and Zaeef had taken place in an attempt to find a broader political settlement.

== 2009 Presidential bid ==
Rocketi was a candidate in the 2009 Afghan Presidential election but subsequently endorsed President Hamid Karzai. In July the same year, he survived a Taliban ambush during a campaign rally in Baghlan Province. Preliminary results placed him 7th in a field of 38.
