= Scott Studenmund =

U.S. soldier (1989–2014)

- Born: Scott Richard Studenmund; June 26, 1989; Pasadena, California, United States
- Died: June 9, 2014 (aged 24); Zabul Province, Afghanistan
- Burial place: Arlington National Cemetery; Arlington, Virginia
- Other name: Scott R. Studenmund
- Alma mater: Pitzer College
- Relatives: Woody Studenmund (father); Jaynie Studenmund (mother)
- Military career
- Allegiance: United States of America
- Branch: United States Army: Special Forces
- Service years: 2009–2014
- Rank: Staff Sergeant
- Units: 5th Special Forces Group (Airborne): Company B, 1st Battalion
- Conflicts: War in Afghanistan: 2014 Gaza Valley airstrike
- Awards: Bronze Star Medal; Purple Heart Medal; Army Commendation Medal; Army Achievement Medal; Meritorious Service Medal; Army Good Conduct Medal
- Memorials: Enduring Heroes Memorial

Scott Richard Studenmund (June 26, 1989 – June 9, 2014) was a United States Army Special Forces soldier. He was killed in action in the 2014 Gaza Valley airstrike in a friendly fire incident that took place in Zabul Province, Afghanistan on June 9, 2014.

Studenmund was awarded the Bronze Star and the Purple Heart.

== Early life ==
Scott Richard Studenmund was born on June 26, 1989, at Huntington Hospital in Pasadena, California. He was the son of former eHarmony executive Jaynie Studenmund and economics professor Woody Studenmund. He is also the grandson of United States Senator Jack R. Miller. He attended Clairbourn School in San Gabriel, California, Flintridge Preparatory School in La Canada, California and Pitzer College prior to volunteering for the U.S. Armed Forces. He played college football as a linebacker for the Pomona-Pitzer Sagehens.

== Military career ==
Studenmund volunteered for the Special Forces 18X Program in 2009. He earned his Green Beret and graduated from the Special Forces Qualification Course in 2011. Studenmund was assigned to Fort Campbell, Kentucky with the 5th Special Forces Group. He was deployed to Afghanistan in 2014.

During the 2014 Gaza Valley airstrike, which took place in the Zabul Province on June 9, 2014, Studenmund was among five U.S. troops alongside one Afghan soldier who were killed when a friendly B-1B Lancer bomber inadvertently dropped laser-guided bombs on their position during a firefight with Taliban forces. As documented in an episode of 60 Minutes, the bomber failed to distinguish friendly troops from the enemy.

== Memorial ==
On June 21, 2014, a memorial service was held for Studenmund at Flintridge Preparatory School. On July 10, 2014, Studenmund was buried at Arlington National Cemetery in Virginia, beside his ODA (Operation Detachment Alpha) teammate Jason McDonald. In 2014, both Clairbourn School and Flintridge Preparatory School established funds named in his honor. Flintridge Preparatory School also honored Studenmund with a memorial wall, while Clairbourn School dedicated their football field to him, renaming it the Scott Studenmund Field.

Studenmund was one of the soldiers honored by having his name inscribed on the Enduring Heroes Memorial erected in Pasadena, California in 2017.

== Medals ==
- The Bronze Star Medal
- The Purple Heart Medal
- The Army Commendation Medal
- The Army Achievement Medal
- The Meritorious Service Medal
- The Army Good Conduct Medal

== See also ==
- 2014 Gaza Valley airstrike
