= 2014 Gaza Valley airstrike =

2014 friendly fire incident by US bomber

- Part of the War in Afghanistan
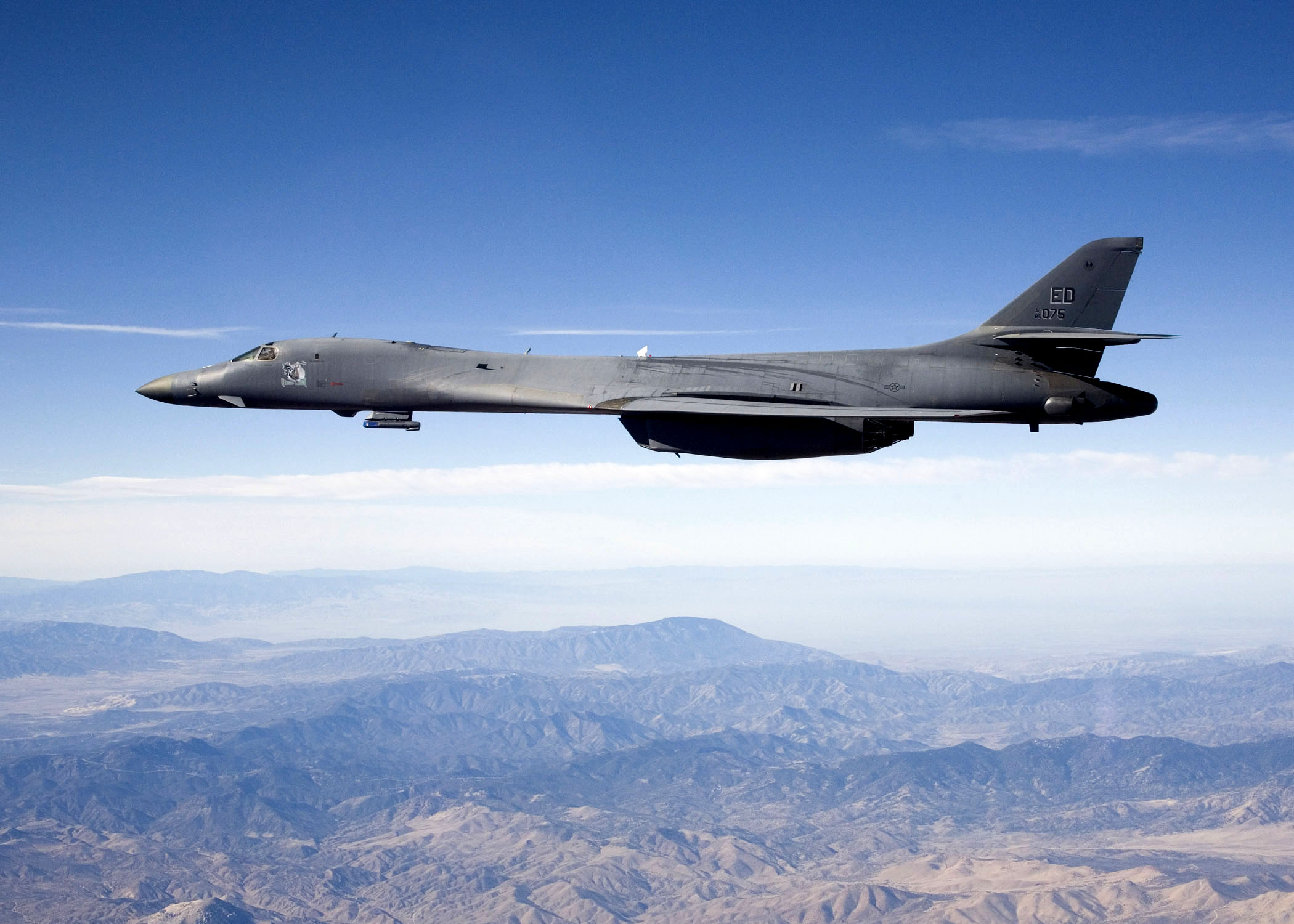
- A Rockwell B-1B Lancer bomber flying with a Sniper Advanced Targeting Pod in 2007.
- Type: Aerial attack
- Location: Arghandab District, Zabul Province, Afghanistan
- Target: Taliban
- Date: 9 June 2014
- Executed by: United States Air Force
- Casualties: (United States) Five U.S. soldiers killed (Islamic Republic of Afghanistan) 1 Afghan commando killed

The 2014 Gaza Valley airstrike was a friendly fire incident that took place in Zabul Province, Afghanistan on 9 June 2014 when five U.S. troops and one Afghan interpreter were killed when a Rockwell B-1B Lancer bomber inadvertently dropped laser-guided bombs on their position during a firefight with Taliban forces. U.S. and Afghan government forces were in the Gaza Valley area of Arghandab District conducting security operations in advance of the 2014 Afghan presidential elections when they came under attack from Taliban militants, sparking a firefight. An American air controller on the ground requested close air support from a B-1B bomber flying in the vicinity to support a team of soldiers maneuvering on a ridge. The U.S. aircraft dropped two guided bombs on the position, killing the team of Americans and an Afghan soldier.

It was the deadliest incident of fratricide to take place between American forces in the country since the beginning of the Afghanistan War, and raised questions over the standard operating procedures of U.S. troops and their close air support assets. An investigation of the incident blamed the airstrike on the commander of the American troops on the ground, the U.S. combat air controller who coordinated the strike, and a flaw in the design of the B-1B bomber's targeting pod which prevents the aircrew from being able to identify the infrared strobes on the helmets of American soldiers that serve to allow pilots to distinguish friendly troops from enemy troops.

== Background ==
=== Before operation ===
Zabul Province is a semi-mountainous region in southern Afghanistan that borders Pakistan to the east, Kandahar in the west and in the south, and Oruzgan in the north. Predominantly Pashtun, it is one of Afghanistan's most sparsely populated provinces with just 45 people per square mile according to a 2015 census, mostly rural tribe members spread among numerous isolated villages in the region. Zabul is one of Afghanistan's poorest provinces and serves as a transit point for fighters entering the country through the porous border with Pakistan. The Taliban have had a presence in Zabul for many years. In 2003, it was the first province in Afghanistan where the group was successful in establishing a large base after the invasion two years prior. However, Zabul was the first province to see Afghan army forces operate independently from NATO forces and was heralded as a model for other provinces, and the presence of U.S. troops has largely been reduced to special operations forces.

In 2014, Afghanistan held a presidential election to replace incumbent Hamid Karzai. The first round of the election was held with no candidate reaching the required 50% threshold to clinch the presidency leaving former Foreign Minister Abdullah Abdullah and ex-World Bank economist Ashraf Ghani to proceed to a runoff election to be held on 14 June. The election was marked by periods of violence perpetrated by the country's Taliban insurgency and it was the first presidential election in Afghanistan where Afghan security forces were leading security for the event. One week before the first round elections, militants attacked the headquarters of the country's election commission in Kabul. In early June 2014, Abdullah Abdullah survived an assassination attempt when his convoy was attacked by a suicide bomber, killing three of his bodyguards.

=== B-1B Lancer ===
Though not designed as a close air support platform the Rockwell B-1B Lancer, a four-engine heavy bomber, has been utilized copiously in support of U.S. and coalition ground forces engaged in combat operations against insurgent forces. In 2012, the nine B-1B bombers of the 9th Expeditionary Bomb Squadron flew 770 sorties on its deployment to Afghanistan. The bomber has proved popular in Afghanistan due to its ability to carry a large payload, and remain in the air for long periods of time, allowing it to fly throughout the country and support multiple ground operations in just one sortie. Beginning in 2007, B-1B bombers began to be outfitted with Sniper Advanced Targeting Pods (AN/AAQ-33), an advanced targeting pod that provides high-resolution FLIR imagery to aircrews to help identify ground targets. According to Air Force Colonel Marilyn Kott the pod, "increases the speed and accuracy with which the aircrew and the JTAC can execute the find-fix-track-target portion of the kill chain."

== Operation ==
=== Units involved and insertion ===
On 8 June 2014, U.S. troops and Afghan security forces began clearing operations in Gaza Valley, in Zabul Province ahead of the 2014 runoff presidential election to be held on 14 June with the aim of disrupting Taliban insurgent activity and improving security for voters and polling sites. U.S. elements involved in the operation included soldiers from the 5th Special Forces Group, and the 4th Infantry Division. Afghan security forces were composed of members of the Afghan National Army (ANA), Afghan National Police (ANP), and the Afghan National Directorate of Security (NDS). The principal ANA unit involved in the operation was the 2nd Kandak, 4th Brigade, 215th Corps, a battalion based in neighboring Helmand Province. One of the units from the 5th Special Forces Group involved in the clearing operations included an Operational Detachment Alpha (ODA) under the command of Captain Derrick Anderson. The ODA's joint terminal attack controller (JTAC), an Air Force specialist trained in coordinating air to ground fire had joined the team on 1 June 2014. The ODA was aided by Afghan troops, though fewer than requested due to manning issues. Prior to the operation the unit assessed the most likely response to the clearing operations by Taliban forces was to be "passive observation" with the threat of small arms fire, and improvised explosive devices.

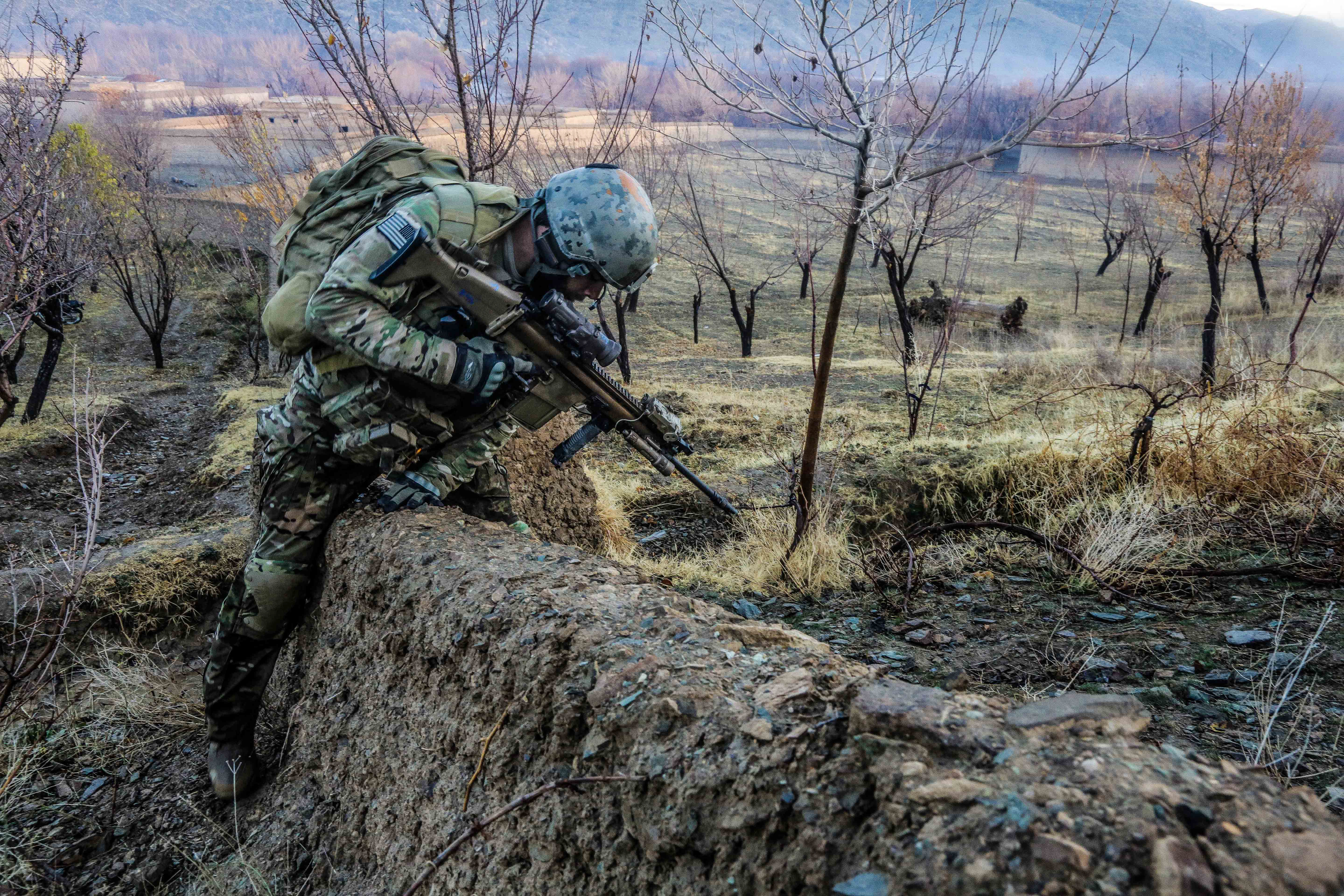
An American special operations soldier in Gaza Valley in 2013.

At 02:30 local time on 9 June, coalition forces entered Gaza Valley by helicopter and began clearing operations with Afghan forces at the lead due to rules of engagement barring U.S. troops from entering Afghan compounds. During the day U.S. and Afghan troops received brief harassing fire from insurgents. It was at this time that Taliban forces began preparing an assault on coalition troops.

=== Firefight ===
Shortly before 20:00 local time, as coalition forces moved to their respective pickup zones (PZs), Taliban forces attacked coalition troops. A B-1B bomber was already in the air, in the vicinity of Gaza Valley, to provide overwatch for friendly forces. Captain Anderson's ODA, supported by Afghan and conventional U.S. troops, began taking fire. The team was split into two elements with six members maneuvering to high ground to more effectively engage insurgent forces. The team reported Taliban positions, some as close as 150 meters (490 feet) away. The JTAC, not with the team that had moved to high ground, asked the B-1B pilots if they could see the IR strobes on the helmets of the U.S. troops on the ground to which the crew responded, "negative IR strobes," before the JTAC began relaying target coordinates to the bomber. In addition, the JTAC gave an incorrect location to the bomber crew of the nearest coalition troops, stating they were 300 meters away (1,000 ft), rather than the actual 150 meters (500 ft), before requesting laser-guided bombs to be dropped on enemy positions. "All friendlies are 300 meters west with IR strobes on taking effective fire; I need you guys in," the JTAC told the bomber crew, to which the crew responded that they would be "in" in one minute. Communication between the element on the ridgeline and the rest of the troops including Captain Anderson, and the air controller degraded as the firefight went on, due to the malfunctioning radios of those troops on the high ground. Just before the airstrike, one of the soldiers, SSgt. Mcdonald of the 5th Special Forces Group had removed the IR strobe on his helmet and attached it to his pack located on the ground to mark his location as friendly.

=== Fatal airstrike ===
At 20:20 local time, the controller cleared the B-1 crew to drop ordnance as it made a final pass over the target site, telling the aircraft it was "cleared hot.". At 20:21 local time, the B-1B bomber dropped two, five-hundred pound JDAM guided bombs on the ridgeline with a five millisecond delay between each bomb. Immediately after the airstrike, U.S. forces on the ground realized the strike was awry, having landed on friendly forces with the ODA's team sergeant stating over the radio that the strike had hit "our hill." The first U.S. troops took seven minutes to reach the ridgeline where they discovered the extent of damage caused by the strike. The blast instantly killed five of the six coalition soldiers on the ridge, with one, SSgt. Scott R. Studenmund of the 5th Special Forces Group, becoming severely wounded. Army medic, SSgt. Brandon Branch discovered the wounded Studenmund and began to apply tourniquets before the gravely wounded Special Forces soldier succumbed to his wounds. Coalition troops immediately descended on the area to recover remains and equipment. The bodies of five of the killed were recovered however a sixth was determined to be incinerated and the troops left the area. A ceremony was held at Kandahar Airfield to honor those killed in the airstrike, before their remains were repatriated to Dover Air Force Base for identification and delivery to the families.

== Casualties ==
- Staff Sergeant Jason A. McDonald, 28, of Butler, Georgia, was a weapons sergeant (18B) in 1st Battalion, 5th Special Forces Group, based out of Fort Campbell, Kentucky. A former member of the 75th Ranger Regiment, he graduated from the Special Forces Qualification Course in 2010 and had previously completed two deployments to Iraq and one to Afghanistan.
- Staff Sergeant Scott R. Studenmund, 24, of Pasadena, California, was a weapons sergeant (18B) in 1st Battalion, 5th Special Forces Group, based out of Fort Campbell, Kentucky. The grandson of former United States Senator Jack R. Miller, he graduated from the Special Forces Qualification Course in 2011 and was on his first combat deployment.
- Specialist Justin R. Helton, 25, of Chillicothe, Ohio, was an explosive ordnance disposal specialist (89D) assigned to the 192nd Ordnance Battalion, 52nd Ordnance Group based out of Fort Bragg, North Carolina.
- Corporal Justin R. Clouse, 22, of Sprague, Washington was assigned as an infantryman to the 4th Infantry Brigade Combat Team, 4th Infantry Division. He was on his second deployment to Afghanistan when he was killed.
- Private First Class Aaron S. Toppen, 19, of Mokena, Illinois was assigned as an infantryman to the 4th Infantry Brigade Combat Team, 4th Infantry Division. He was on his first deployment to Afghanistan at the time.
- Sergeant Gulbuddin Ghulam Sakhi, 31, was an Afghan National Army rifle squad leader in the 2nd Kandak.

== Investigative findings ==
Air Force Major General Jeffrey L. Harrigian was commissioned to investigate the strike. Harrigian commenced an eight-week probe into the incident which included interviewing the B-1 crew, the air controller, and the other U.S. troops who were on the ground that day as well as examining the U.S. equipment used in the strike, such as the bomber's targeting pod, and listening to radio transmissions. At the end of his investigation, Harrigian declared that the "incident was avoidable," and put the blame largely on Captain Derrick Anderson, the commander of the U.S. troops on the ground that day, the unnamed Air Force joint terminal attack controller who had guided the airstrike, and mistakes made by the B-1 crew.

Harrigian cited a false sense of urgency created by the U.S. troops on the ground who stated they were taking "effective fire" that led to unwarranted pressure being placed on the B-1B crew to hastily carry out an airstrike. During a 60 Minutes interview in 2017, Army medic Brandon Branch and 5th Special Forces Group soldier Henry Montalbano criticized this characterization by saying it was an unfair description of the events on the ground made by someone who was not there at the time.

Air Force combat controllers in Afghanistan during a nighttime operation.

In addition, Harrigian pointed to mistakes made by the JTAC including giving an incorrect location of the nearest U.S. troops to the target coordinates, not following correct procedures, lacking situational awareness, failing to declare "danger close" since the nearest friendly forces were within 300 meters, and not assuring that the pilots had made positive identification of the target. Anderson was rebuked for failing to properly supervise the JTAC assigned to his team.

At no time did the pilots question the information provided by the JTAC, even when the distances of U.S. troops to the target inexplicably changed. Harrigian said the pilots relied too much on a single source of information, the Sniper Pod, and did not take additional steps to confirm the location of friendly forces. The Sniper Pod is not capable of identifying IR strobes and the night-vision goggles used by the crew can only detect IR strobes at ranges up to 7,000 meters, hampering the crew's ability to separate friendly and enemy forces on the battlefield. It was not known by any of the U.S. forces on the ground that day that the B-1B Sniper Pod was incapable of detecting infrared strobes, which is one of the primary methods used by coalition forces to identify friendly forces at nighttime. Instead, the B-1B crew had used muzzle flashes as a way of locating its target.

=== Consequences ===
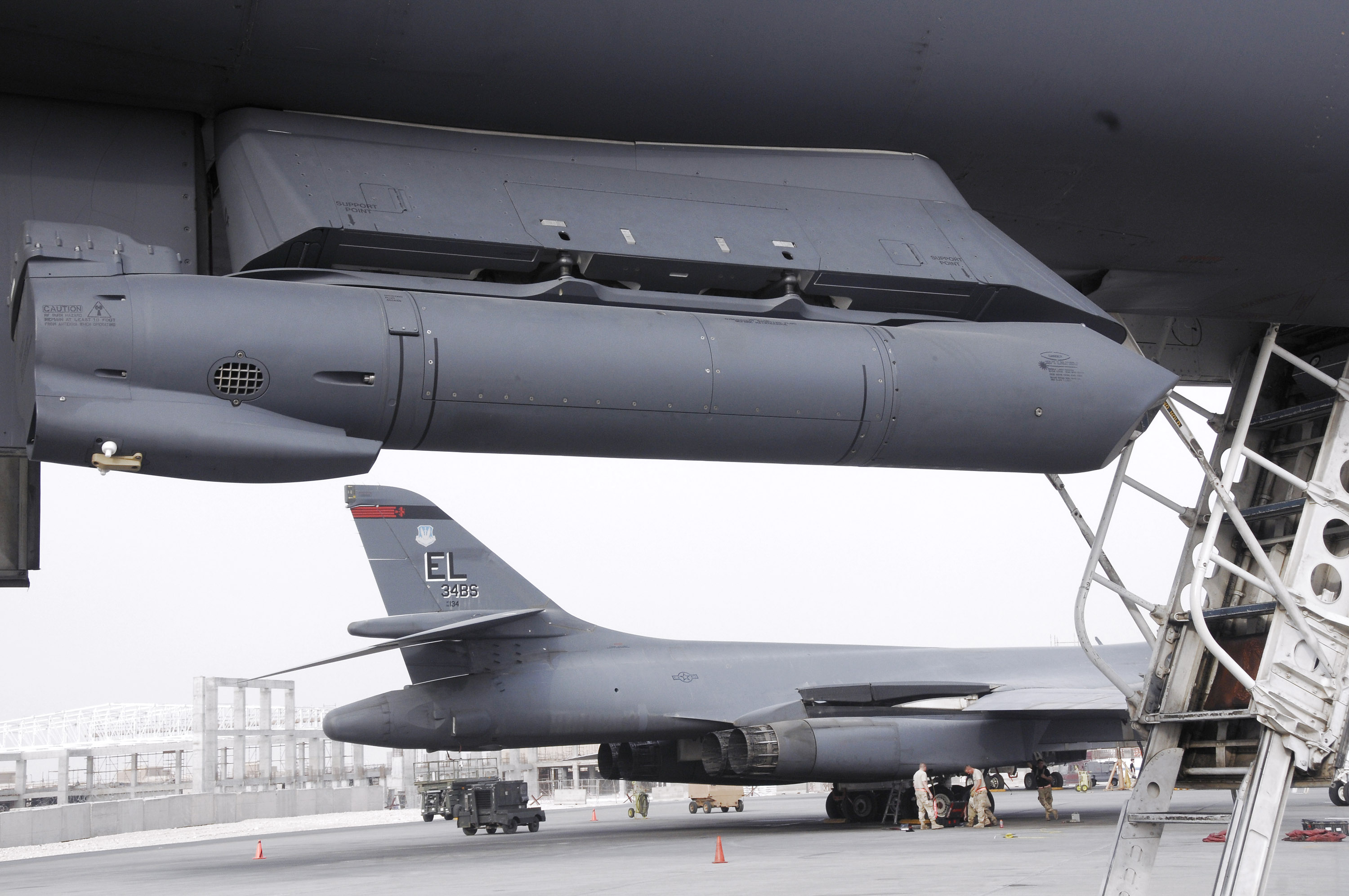
A closer view of the Sniper Advanced Targeting Pod

Captain Derrick Anderson, through the use of his own lawyers, was ultimately cleared of any responsibility in the strike and faced no punitive action, however the incident led to end of his military career. The Air Force JTAC who called in the strike was ultimately forced out of the special operations community. Despite the flaws in the Sniper Pod, no plans have been made fix the issue, however B-1B crews have been made aware of the critical flaw and received retraining on the device as a result. No changes have been made to the B-1B's use as a close air support platform. According to Woody Studenmund, the father of one of the soldiers killed in the air strike, "None of the other mistakes mattered, none of them mattered. When we send our soldiers into battle, it's wrong to have them using a weapon system which isn't capable of doing what it's supposed to be doing. It's not murder, but it's close."

== See also ==
- Joint terminal attack controller
- List of friendly fire incidents
- B-1 Lancer
- Sniper Advanced Targeting Pod
- List of military operations in the war in Afghanistan (2001–present)
- Attacks on the United States
