= Ẕāmi Kalay =

Ẕāmi Kalay زما خلایې
- Town
- Location in Afghanistan
- Coordinates: 31°46′N 67°20′E
- Country: Afghanistan
- Province: Zabul Province

Population
  - Total: 1,657
- Time zone: UTC+4:30 (Afghanistan Standard Time)

Ẕāmi Kalay (Pashto: زما خلایې) is a town located in Zabol Province, Afghanistan in the Shinkay District. The population is around 1,657 people living there. The town is near Qalat.

== See also ==
- Zabul Province
