= Shinkay District =

Shinkay شینکی
- District
- Location within Afghanistan
- Country: Afghanistan
- Province: Zabul

Shinkay District (Pashto: شینکۍ) is a district of Zabul province in southern Afghanistan.

== Demographics ==
Shinkay has a population of about 22,900 as of 2013. It contains the town of Ẕāmi Kalay. The district is mostly populated by the Tokhi tribe of Ghilji Pashtuns.

== See also ==
- Districts of Afghanistan
- Wallace Fard Muhammad, the enigmatic founder of the Nation of Islam; one of the multiple possible people associated with him claimed on a World War I draft card to be a native of "Shinka" in Afghanistan
