= Nasar (Pashtun tribe) =

Pashtun tribe

The Nasar tribe (Pashto: ناصر) is an ethnic Pashtun Ghilzai tribe mainly living in Afghanistan and some in Pakistan. Nasar has mostly remained a nomadic traders tribe throughout history due to which it spread in the provinces of Zabul, Kunar, Paktia, Laghman, Nangarhar and Ghazni. The Nasar people also live in the Khyber Pakhtunkhwa region (Dera Ismail Khan, Draban Kalan) and Balochistan (Districts like Loralai, Quetta, Kuchlak, Duki, District Lower Dir Khall Sanjavi, Zhob and Musakhail).

The Nasar tribe, also known as Nasari, belongs to the Pashtuns. The genealogy of this tribe traces back to their ancestor Nasar, from whom they derive their name. It is believed that Nasar was travelling to India, where he was killed in a battle. So now his tomb is used to be located in Jalandhar district, Punjab, India.

There are some historical narratives suggesting that Nasar and Hotak were brothers, both are sons of Dorkha, grandsons of Baro, and great-grandsons of Turan Krosiyan. However, some members of the Nasar tribe dispute this claim, and some consider Shah Hussain Ghori as their forefather.

Historical Reference

The historian Muhammad Hayat Khan, in his book Hayat Afghani (written 155 years ago), describes the Nasar Pashtuns as follows:

They are Ghilji Pashtuns, primarily nomadic shepherds and traders.

They migrates with their livestock between regions, spending spring and summer in areas which is inhabited by Tokhi and Hotak Ghiljis.

So they mostly engage in trade, agriculture horticulture and transporting goods to Kabul, Kandahar, and other areas of Afghanistan

When water shortages occur in area, they move towards regions with better grazing lands.

During winter, they are settling in Daman, located in Dera Ismail Khan, where different branches of the Nasar tribe are living The Nasar people rely on livestock farming. They make woolen tents, carpets, and other essential items from sheep's wool and produce butter, cheese, and yogurt from milk. They raise and breeding goats, cattle, camels, and predominantly sheep. Their tents are small and lightweight, making them ideal for a nomadic lifestyle. Historically, they were known for being honest and peaceful people.

The book Hayat Afghani also mentions the tribal elders, leaders, and scholars from the Nasar tribe, including:

Khwaja Mir Khan Nasar (a great tribal leader)

Malik Shehzad Khan

Malik Madad Khan

Malik Allah Dad Khan

Malik Mir Alam Khan

Malik Dost Muhammad Khan

Qalandar Bacha Nasar (a well-known scholar and spiritual leader)

Sub-Branches of the Nasar Tribe

The Nasar tribe is divided into three main branches: Tor (Black) Nasars, Sur (Red) Nasars, and Spin (White) Nasars. Each branch is further divided into multiple sub-clans, including:

Malizai, Naematkhail, Shadikhel, Sarprekarai, Mandi, Dawoodkhel, Naso Khel, Umarzi, Kamal Khel, Nemat Khel, Syed Ahmad Khel, Bori Khel (Bari Khel), Bano Khel, Zangi Khel, Jalal Khel, Khankhel, Long Khel, Badi Zai, Khadar Zai, Babat Khel, Izzat Khel, Babur Khel, Ya Khel, Ishaq Khel, Farman Khel, Sewarki, Shad Zai, Auria Khel, Manak Khel, Behr Khel, Chalaki Khel, Yahya Khel, Alam Baig Khel, and many more.

Regions of Nasar Tribal Settlement

The Nasar tribe is found in Afghanistan and South-Western Pashtun regions of Balochistan and Khyber Pashtoonkhwa in Pakistan.

In Afghanistan, they reside in:

1. Kabul Province – Kohdaman, Shakardara, Gul Dara, Paghman, and Charkhi Pul areas.

2. Zabul Province – Shahjoy, Qalat, and Atghar.

3. Laghman Province – Alingar and Qarghayi districts.

4. Kandahar Province – East of Kandahar city and Arghandab’s Joi Lahore area.

5. Logar Province – Muhammad Agha and Pul Alam.

6. Nangarhar Province – Hesarak, Bati Kot, and Chaparhar.

7. Paktia Province – Sayed Karam district (mainly Black Nasars).

8. Parwan Province – Cheklo region. 9. Helmand Province – Garmsir district.

10. Ghazni Province – Various locations.

11. Paktika Province – Wazakhwa district.

12. Baghlan Province – Kilagi desert and other areas.

13. Kunduz Province – Various locations.

In Pakistan (South-Western regions), Nasars reside in:

1. Quetta and surrounding regions – Khrotabad, Nasirabad.

2. Loralai, Zhob, kuchlak and Pishin.

3. Duki, Nasarabad

4. Dera Ismail Khan and Daraban.

5. Dera Ghazi Khan – A small Nasar population is also found here.

6. Layyah – A small Nasar population is also found here. ---

Notable Figures from the Nasar Tribe

1. Saidaal Khan Nasar - A Nasar chieftain and a prominent military leader during the time of the Hotak Empire, known for his fierce resistance against the Safavid Empire's control over Afghan territories.

2. Sayedal Khan Nasar – A Pakistani politician who is senator-elect for the Senate of Pakistan from Balochistan province. He is currently serving as deputy chairman of senate.

3. Major General Muhammad Omar Khan Nasar – Known as the "Red General", he was a key commander in the Third Anglo-Afghan War (1919) in Jalalabad.

4. Najibullah Nasar - deputy speaker Kabul parliament from last government of Ashraf Ghani. He is the current tribal leader of all Nasar tribe in Afghanistan.

5. Muhammad Dawood Khan Nasar - A senior Pakistani jurist who currently serves as the Registrar of the High Court of Balochistan. A career judicial officer, he has held various positions within the district and sessions courts of Balochistan for over two decades.

6. Muhammad Akbar Nasar - A prominent Pakistani healthcare administrator and public official. He is currently serving as the Company Secretary for the People's Primary Healthcare Initiative (PPHI) Balochistan.

7. Sardar Muhammad Yaqoob Khan Nasar. He is the tribal leader of Nasars in Pakistan and considered a tribal elder by Nasars in Afghanistan. He has remained on multiple occasions as Federal Minister, Member of National Assembly, and Senator.

8. Dr. Muhammad Yousuf Nasar - Prominent Ear, Nose, and Throat (ENT) surgeon based in Quetta, Balochistan. He is highly regarded for his expertise in treating conditions related to the ear, nose, and throat.

9. Former Major General Muhammad Ishaq Nasar.

10. Former Deputy Chief of Staff of the Afghan National Defense Ministry, Sardar Ali Mohammad Afzal Khan Nasar.

11. Rais Faiz Muhammad Khan Nasar – Founder of Afghanistan’s National Bank.

12. Former Major General Muhammad Ishaq Khan Nasar, a commander of the Eastern Brigade.

13. Lieutenant General (Naib Salar) Murad Ali Khan Nasar, a former Defense Ministry Chief Inspector.

14. General Muhammad Rahim Nasar, who served as Governor of Kunar during the reign of King Zahir Shah.

15. Haji Baz Muhammad Khan Nasar, a senator during King Zahir Shah’s reign.

16. Shaheed Haji Muhammad Nabi Nasar, former Mujahideen commander and tribal elder of Nasar in Laghman Province.

Sources

1. Hayat Afghani, Pages 294-296, Peshawar Edition (2007). 2. Pashtun Tribes (2007 Edition, Peshawar). 3. Genealogy and History of Pashtun Tribes, Pages 253-256, Maiwand Publications, Peshawar (2004). 4. Data collected from various print and online sources.

== History ==
Saidal Khan Nasar was considered a Nasar chieftain and a prominent military leader during the time of the Hotak Empire (1709–1738), known for his fierce resistance against the Safavid Empire's control over Afghan territories. His actions contributed to the Afghan struggle for independence, specifically in campaigns led by Mirwais Hotak and later his successors. According to The Kingdom of Afghanistan: A Historical Sketch by George P. Tate, Saidal Khan was instrumental in organizing and leading Pashtun forces in key battles that weakened Persian control in the region. His leadership and valor were emblematic of the broader Pashtun resistance against foreign rule, exemplifying the Nasar tribe's historic association with honor and warfare.

Tate's work highlights that figures like Saidal Khan were not only significant as military commanders but also as symbols of Pashtun unity and resistance. His contributions in battles, particularly around Kandahar, became legendary, and he is remembered as a pivotal figure who upheld the autonomy of Afghan tribes during a period marked by both internal and external conflicts.
