= Shamulzayi District =

Shamulzayi شملزائی
- District
- Location within Afghanistan
- Country: Afghanistan
- Province: Zabul

Shamulzayi District (Pashto: شملزائی) is a district of Zabul province in southern Afghanistan.

== Demographics ==
It has a population of about 25,100 as of 2013. The district is mostly populated by the Tokhi tribe of Ghilji Pashtuns.

== See also ==
- Districts of Afghanistan
