= Tarnak =

Tarnak may refer to:

- Tarnak River, Afghanistan
- Tarnak Aw Jaldak District, Afghanistan
- Tarnak Farms, Afghanistan
