= Naw Bahar District =

Naw Bahar نوبهار
- District
- Location within Afghanistan
- Country: Afghanistan
- Province: Zabul

Naw Bahar District (Pashto: د نو بهار ولسوالۍ) or Naway Bahar District (Pashto: د نوي بهار ولسوالۍ) is a district of Zabul province in southern Afghanistan.

== Demographics ==
Naw Bahar has a population of about 18,300 as of 2013. The district is mostly populated by the Tokhi tribe of Ghilji Pashtuns.

== See also ==
- Districts of Afghanistan
