= Arghandab District, Zabul =

Arghandab ارغنداب
- District
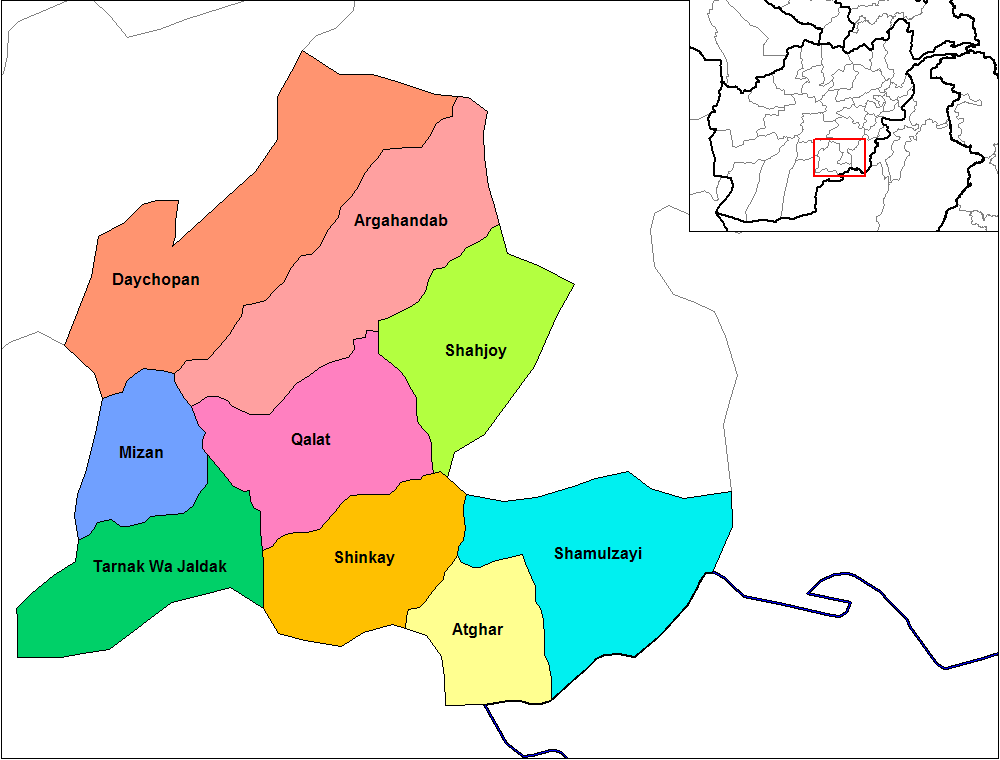
- Arghandab district (in pink) within the province of Zabul.

- Location in Afghanistan
- Coordinates: 32°35′47″N 66°55′41″E
- Country: Afghanistan
- Province: Zabul

Population (2019)
  - Total: 36,298
- Time zone: UTC+4:30

Arghandab District (Pashto: ارغنداب ولسوالۍ) is a District of Zabul Province, Afghanistan. The population in 2019 was estimated at 36,298.

The district is within the heartland of the Tokhi tribe of Ghilji Pashtuns.

== History ==
A new high-capacity health clinic, providing expanded medical services, opened its doors during a ribbon cutting ceremony in Arghandab district, on January 25, 2012.

On May 12, 2018, insurgents stormed Arghandab district, killing 22 police personnel and wounding 12 others. The rebels also captured three security posts.

On November 11, 2019, the Taliban fighters overran the alternate Arghandab district headquarters and killed the local chief of police and senior intelligence officer. Arghandab was one of 64 districts that were identified as “either operating outside the premises of the districts or have been relocated,” TOLONews reported in June 2019. In the case of Arghandab, the administrative center was relocated to another part of the district, as the Taliban controlled the original headquarters.

On 29 Mar 2020, Taliban militants attacked checkpoints in Arghandab district.

On August 8, 2020, while the Mujahidin of the Islamic Emirate were providing security, a wrestling competition was held by wrestlers from different villages of the district.
