= Sniper Advanced Targeting Pod =

Military aircraft targeting pod

Sniper ATP
- Infrared targeting pod
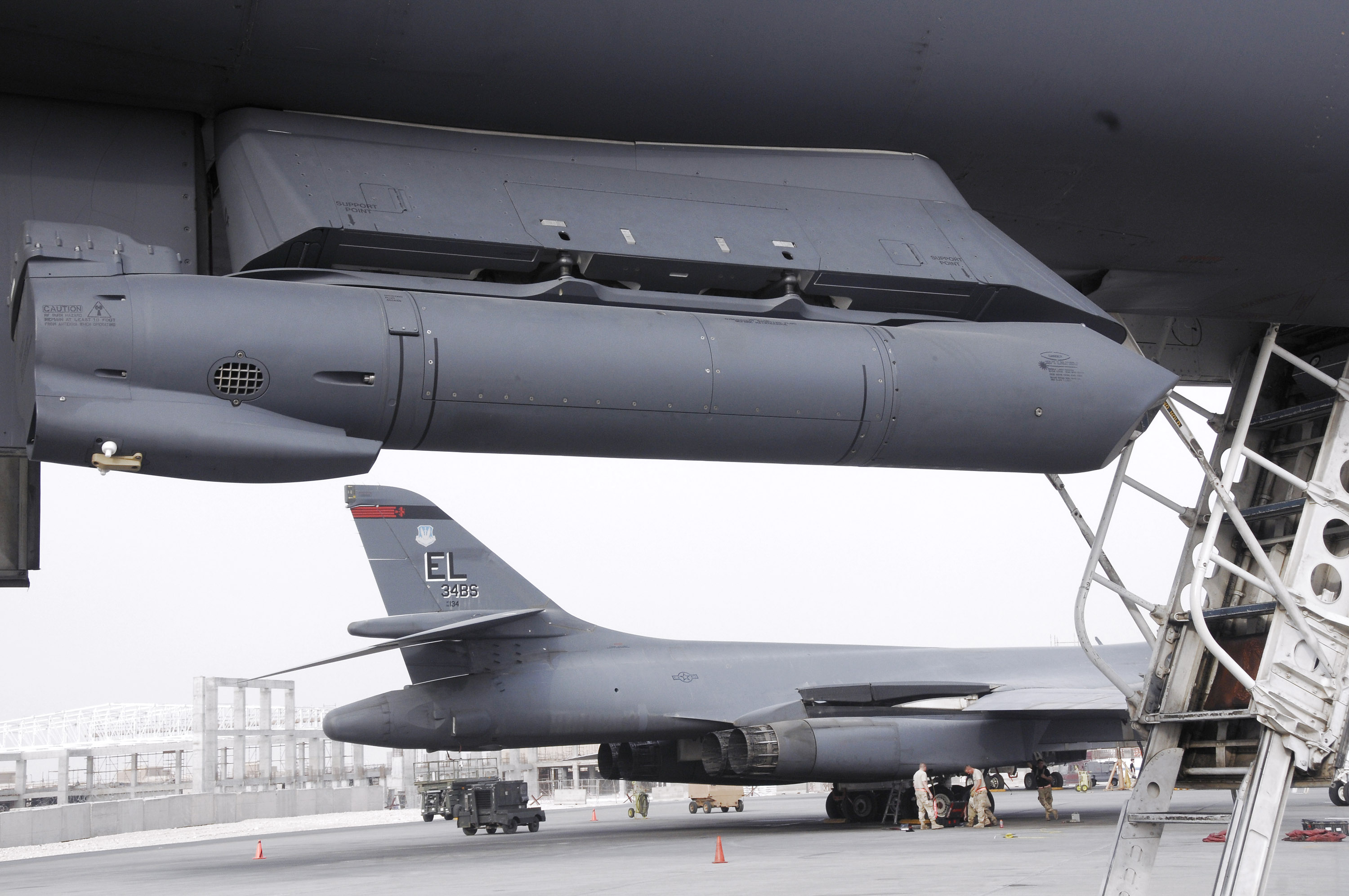
- Sniper Advanced Targeting Pod on B-1B Lancer hardpoint mount
- Status: In service

Manufacturing Info
- Manufacturer(s): Lockheed Martin
- Introduced: January 1, 2014; 12 years ago
- Production period: 2014–present

Specifications
- Length: 98.2 in (2,490 mm)
- Diameter: 11.9 in (300 mm)
- Weight: 446 lb (202 kg)

Usage
- Used by military: See § Operators
- Platform(s): See § Operators
- Variants: Sniper ATP; Sniper XR; Sniper; Sniper ATP-SE; PANTERA

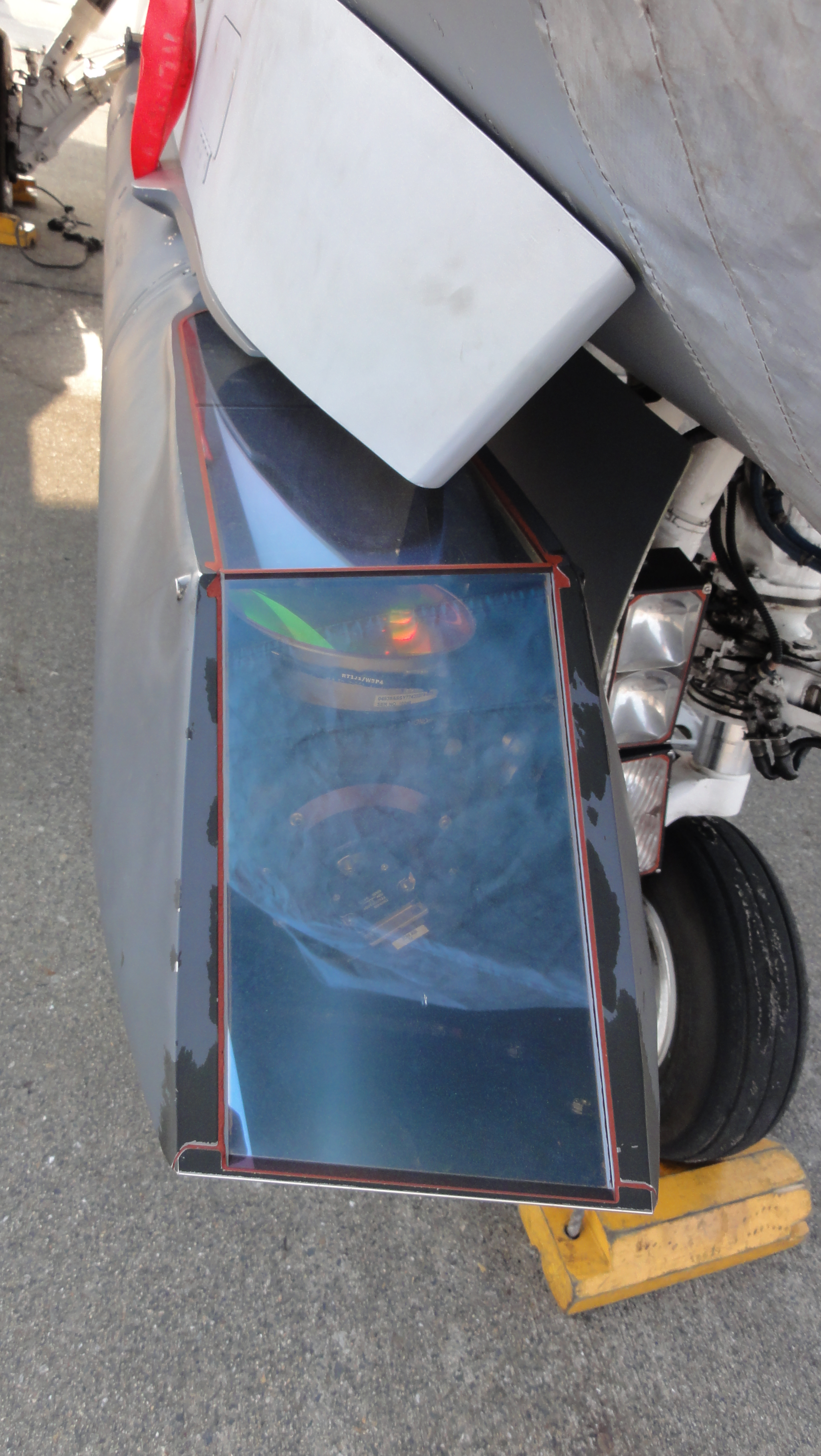
Sniper pod on F-16 Fighting Falcon

The Sniper is a family of targeting pods for military aircraft manufactured by Lockheed Martin providing positive target identification, autonomous tracking, GPS coordinate generation, and precise munition guidance from extended standoff ranges.

The system has been designated AN/AAQ-33 in U.S. military service as the Sniper Advanced Targeting Pod (ATP). Further variants are the Sniper Extended Range (XR), as well as the PANTERA export derivative of the Sniper XR. The Lockheed Martin F-35 Lightning II is built with the equivalent of the Sniper XR in its onboard sensors called the AN/AAQ-40 Electro-Optical Targeting System (EOTS). The most modern version is the Sniper Advanced Targeting Pod - Sensor Enhancement (ATP-SE).

In accordance with the Joint Electronics Type Designation System (JETDS), the AN/AAQ-33 and AN/AAQ-40 designations represent the 33rd and 40th designs of an Army-Navy electronic device for an airborne infrared special-purpose/combination system. The JETDS system also now is used to name all Department of Defense and some NATO electronic systems.

== Design ==
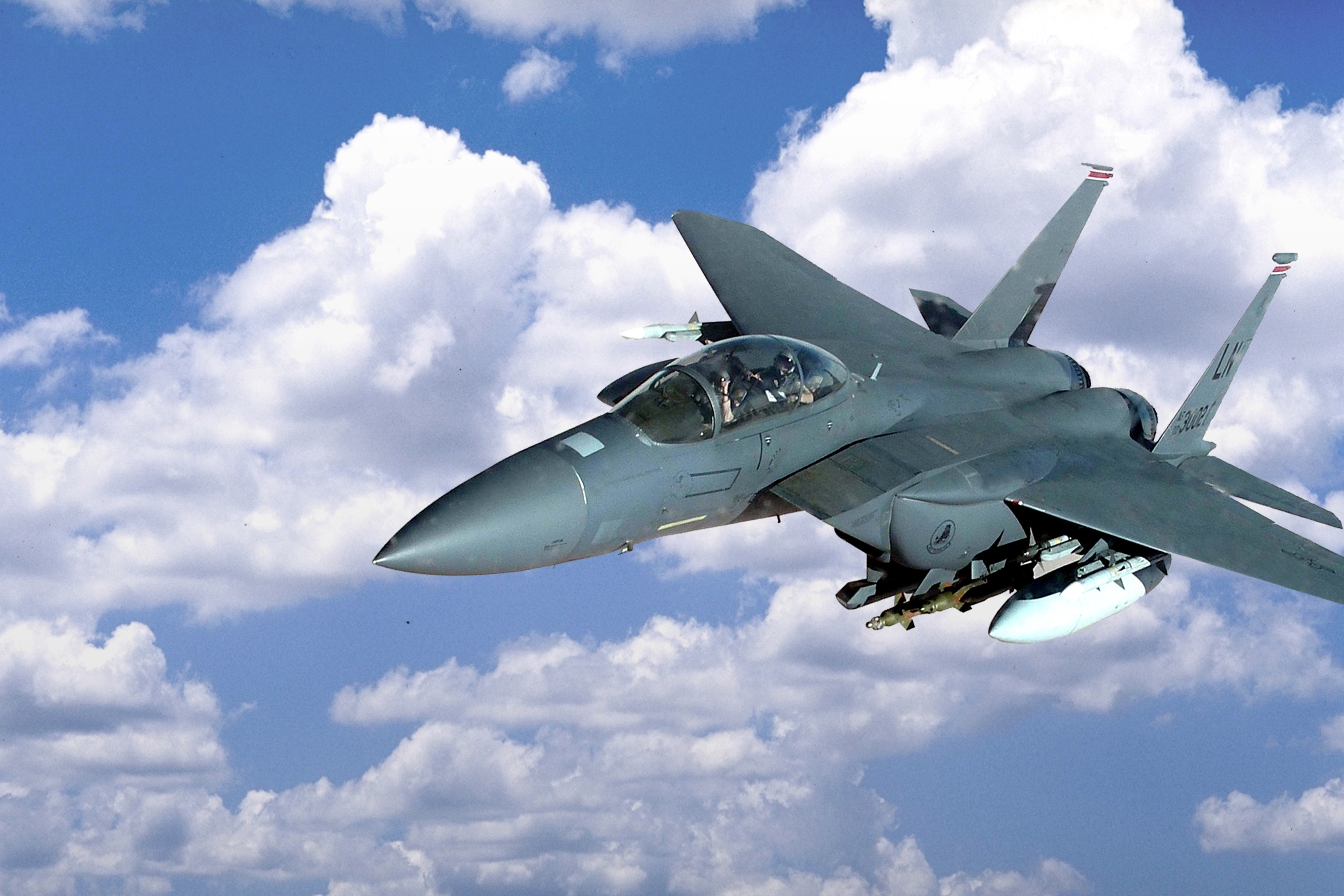
F-15E Strike Eagle with Sniper pod under engine intake

The Sniper is a single, lightweight targeting pod with lower aerodynamic drag than the systems it replaces. Its image processing allows aircrews to detect, identify and engage tactical-size targets outside the range of most enemy air defenses, allowing it to be used during destruction of enemy air defense missions. It can support urban engagements beyond jet noise range for counter-insurgency operations. It offers an increase in detection range over the older LANTIRN system, and is employed on many U.S. Air Force and multinational aircraft.

The pod incorporates a high definition mid-wave FLIR, dual-mode laser, visible-light HDTV, laser spot tracker, laser marker, video data link, and a digital data recorder. Sensors and image processing incorporating image stabilization enable targets to be identified at ranges that minimize exposure to defensive enemy systems. An eye-safe mode can be used for urban combat and training operations along with a laser-guided bomb designation laser.

The pod's FLIR allows observation and tracking through smoke and clouds, and in low light / no light conditions. The CCD camera supports the same operations in visible light for most daylight conditions.

For target coordination with ground and air forces, a laser spot tracker, a laser marker, and an HDTV quality video down-link to ground-based controllers supports target detection and identification. The Sniper can also provide high-resolution imagery for non-traditional intelligence, surveillance and reconnaissance (NTISR) missions without occupying the centerline station on small fighter aircraft, and can maintain surveillance even when the aircraft maneuvers. As a result, a second, dedicated fighter aircraft isn't needed to provide protection to a dedicated ISR aircraft.

For ease of maintenance, the pod's optical bed design, partitioning, and diagnostic capabilities permit two-level maintenance, eliminating costly intermediate-level support. Automated built-in testing allows maintenance personnel to isolate and replace a line replaceable unit in under 20 minutes to restore full mission-capable status.

== History ==
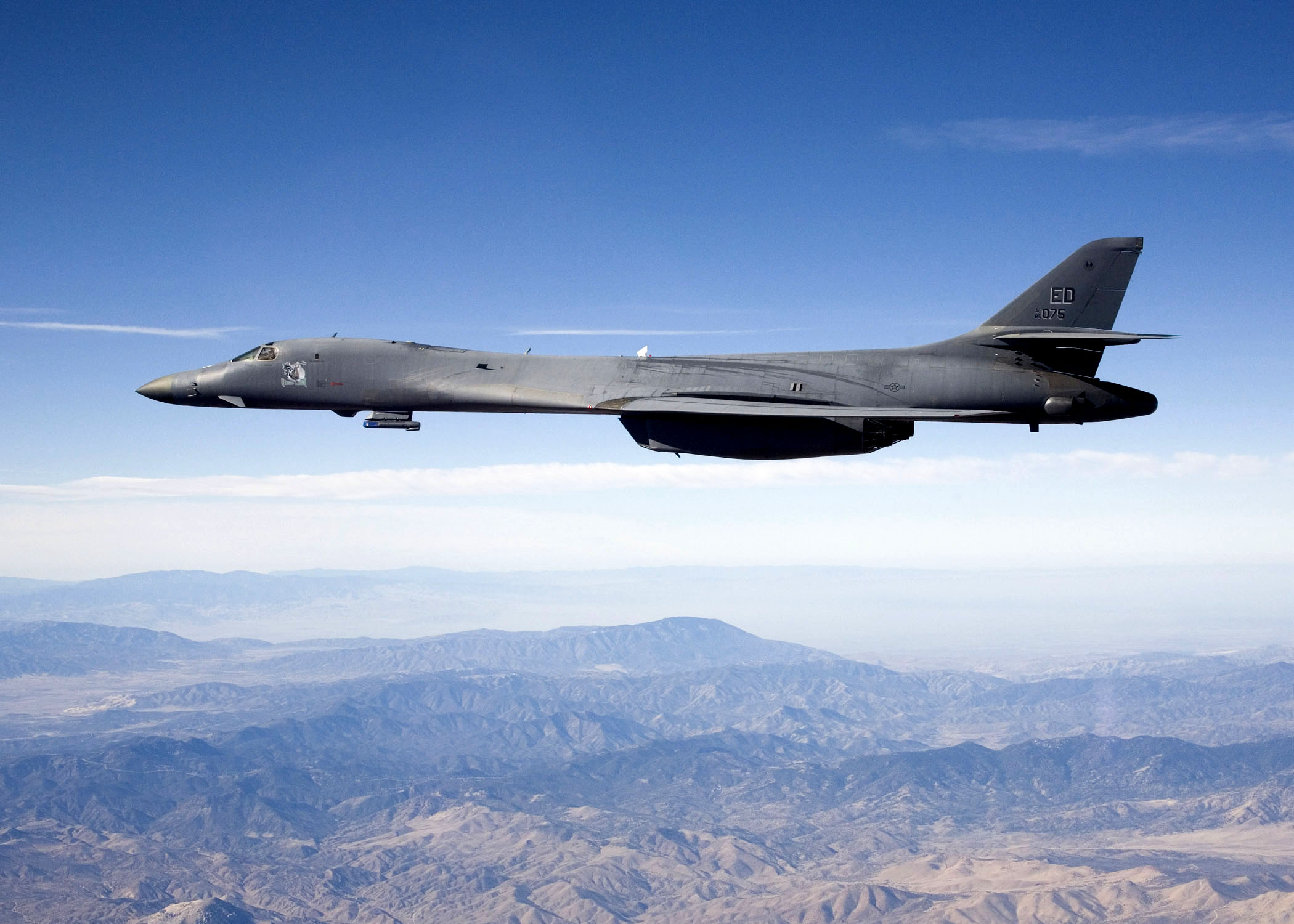
B-1B Lancer with Sniper pod (front section)

In August 2001, the USAF announced Lockheed Martin's Sniper as the winner of the Advanced Targeting Pod (ATP) competition. The contract provided for pods and associated equipment, spares and support of the F-16 and F-15E aircraft for the Air Force and Air National Guard. The U.S. Air Force's initial seven-year contract for Sniper ATP had a potential value in excess of US$843 (equivalent to $1,533 in 2025) million. Lockheed Martin has delivered over 125 Sniper ATP pods and the U.S. Air Force had plans to procure at least 522 more. The follow-on Advanced Targeting Pod – Sensor Enhancement (ATP-SE) contract was split between the Lockheed Martin Sniper and the LITENING.

In 2008, a team of Lockheed Martin UK, BAE Systems and Leonardo S.p.A. (SELEX Sensors and Airborne Systems at the time) successfully demonstrated a Sniper ATP on board the Tornado GR4 combat aircraft.

In 2014, the USAF declared initial operational capability (IOC) milestone for the Sniper ATP-SE which included sensor and networking improvements.

Also in 2014, the Sniper program came under criticism in the aftermath of a deadly airstrike in Afghanistan resulting in the death of one Afghan and five American soldiers killed when a B-1B bomber equipped with the pod could not detect the infrared strobe lights on the helmets of U.S. troops in a firefight. This was the deadliest case of friendly fire between American forces during the course of the war in Afghanistan.

On 27 March 2015, Lockheed Martin was awarded a sole-source contract by the US DOD worth $485 million firm fixed price with minimal cost-plus-fixed-fee, indefinite-delivery/indefinite-quantity to provide multiple Sniper advanced targeting pods to the USAF.

Lockheed Martin announced in 2016 that Kuwait would be the first country to use Sniper on the Eurofighter Typhoon.

In May 2024, the Taiwanese Ministry of National Defense released video footage confirming the F-16V Viper fighter aircraft of their Republic of China Air Force calibrated the AN/AAQ-33 Sniper ATP pod against Shenyang J-16D and Xi'an H-6K aircraft of the Chinese People's Liberation Army Air Force crossing into the Taiwanese air defense identification zone (ADIZ).

As of 2025, the Sniper is used on the USAF's B-52H Stratofortress, B-1B Lancer, F-15E Strike Eagle, F-16 Fighting Falcon, and A-10 Thunderbolt II. It was also used on the British Harrier GR9 and the Canadian CF-18 Hornet.

In November 2025, Lockheed Martin revealed the Sniper NTP version which supports the Multifunction Advanced Data Link aka MADL.

== Platforms ==
=== Current platforms ===
- A-10 Thunderbolt II
- B-1B Lancer
- B-52 Stratofortress
- CF-18 Hornet
- Dassault Rafale
- Eurofighter Typhoon
- F-15E Strike Eagle
- F-16 Fighting Falcon
- Harrier jump jet
- Mitsubishi F-2
- T-50 Golden Eagle

== Operators ==
=== Current operators ===
Belgium
Belgian Air Component

Canada
Royal Canadian Air Force

Egypt
Egyptian Air Force

Indonesia
Indonesian Air Force

Iraq
Iraqi Air Force

Japan
Japan Air Self-Defense Force

Jordan
Royal Jordanian Air Force

Morocco
Royal Moroccan Air Force

Netherlands
Royal Netherlands Air and Space Force

Norway
Royal Norwegian Air Force

Oman
Royal Air Force of Oman

Pakistan
Pakistan Air Force

Poland
Polish Air Force

Romania
Romanian Air Force

Saudi Arabia
Royal Saudi Air Force

Singapore
Republic of Singapore Air Force

Slovakia
Slovak Air Force

South Korea
Republic of Korea Air Force

Taiwan
Republic of China Air Force

Thailand
Royal Thai Air Force

Turkey
Turkish Air Force

United Arab Emirates
United Arab Emirates Air Force

United States
United States Air Force

== Specifications ==
Source: Product datasheet

- Primary function: Positive identification, automatic tracking and laser designation
- Length: 98.2 inches (249 cm)
- Diameter: 11.9 inches (30 cm)
- Weight: 446 pounds (202 kg)
- Sensors: Mid-wave third generation forward looking infrared, dual mode eye-safe laser designator, Charge-coupled device-TV, and laser spot tracker
- Field of regard: -155º to +5º

== See also ==
- AN/ASQ-228 ATFLIR
- List of military electronics of the United States

== Bibliography ==
- Cooper, Tom (2018). Hot Skies Over Yemen, Volume 2: Aerial Warfare Over Southern Arabian Peninsula, 1994-2017. Warwick, UK: Helion & Company Publishing. ISBN 978-1-911628-18-7.
