= Kakar District =

District in southern Afghanistan

Kakar (Pashto: کاکړ) is a district of Zabul Province in southern Afghanistan. It has a population of about 23,400 as of 2013.

The majority of the population belong to the Khowazak Pashtun tribes. Other tribes of the district are Kakar, Kharoti and Hatwal. The district is known for its agriculture, especially dry fruits. Kakar district is the second most educated district of Zabul province.

== See also ==
- Districts of Afghanistan
