= Atghar District =

Atghar اتغر
- District
- Location within Afghanistan
- Coordinates: 31°43′30″N 67°23′06″E
- Country: Afghanistan
- Province: Zabul

Atghar District (Pashto: د اټګر ولسوالۍ) is a district of Zabul province in southern Afghanistan.

== Demographics ==
The population in 2005 was estimated 8,400 in 2013. The district is mostly populated by the Hotak tribe of Ghilji Pashtuns.

== History ==
The district's military base was evacuated on 22 December 2020, indicating an incoming the Taliban presence there.

== See also ==
- Districts of Afghanistan
