= Shahjoy District =

Shahjoy شاه‌جوی
- District
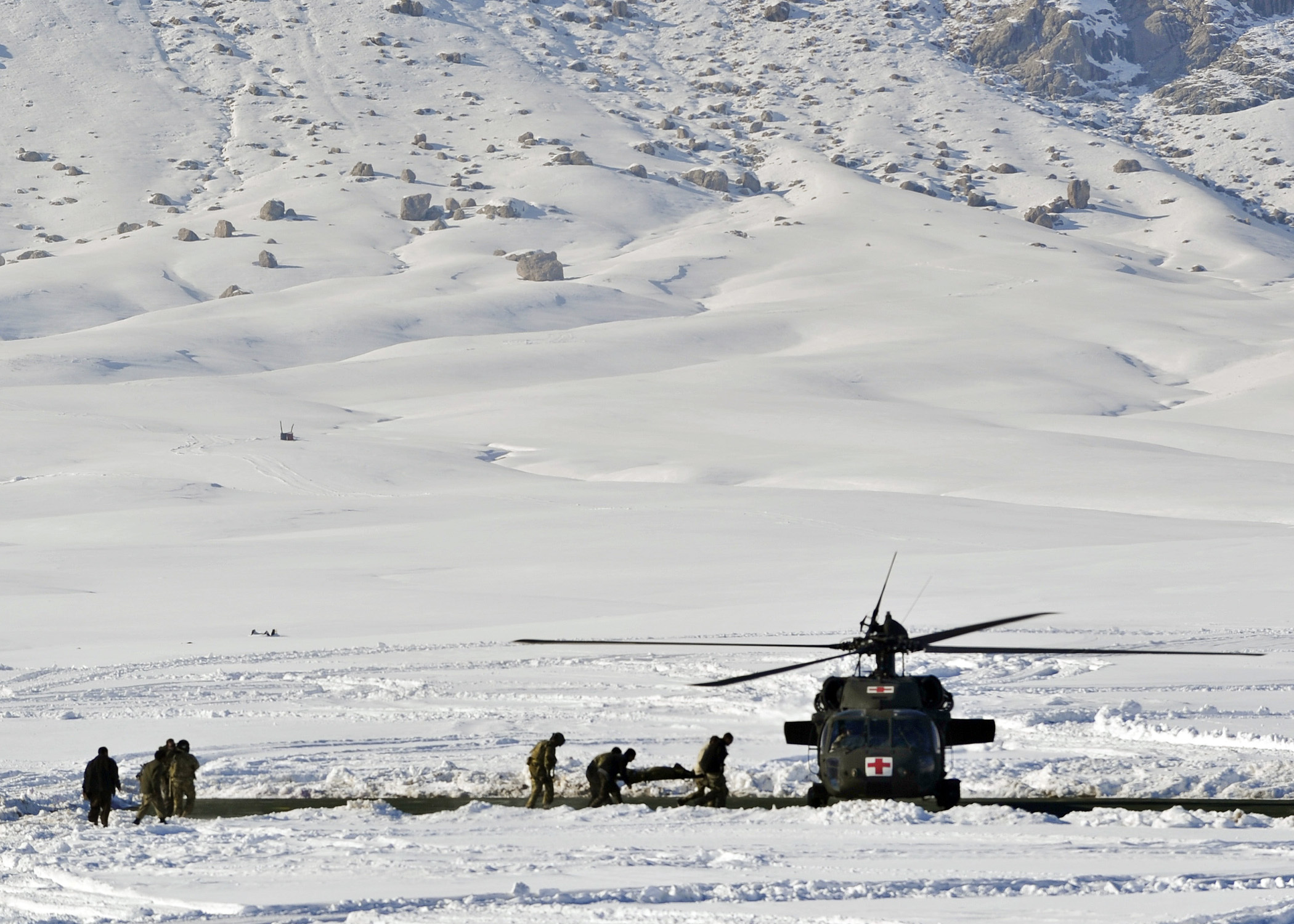
- Afghan Local Police and coalition special operations forces load a police member needing medical care onto an MH-60 Black Hawk helicopter during a medical evacuation in January 2012

- Location within Afghanistan
- Country: Afghanistan
- Province: Zabul

Shahjoy District (Pashto: شاه جوی) is a district of Zabul province in southern Afghanistan. It is located in the eastern part of the province, bordering Ghazni province.

== Demographics ==
It has a population of about 56,800 as of 2013. The district is mostly populated by the Hotak tribe of Ghilji Pashtuns.

== See also ==
- Districts of Afghanistan
