= Clairbourn School =

Private school in San Gabriel, California, US

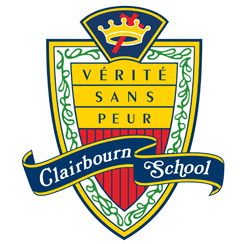

Location
- 8400 Huntington Drive; San Gabriel, (Los Angeles County), California 91775; United States
- Coordinates: 34°07′40″N 118°05′10″W

Information
- Type: Private, Co-Ed
- Motto: Vérité Sans Peur (Truth Without Fear)
- Established: 1926
- Head of school: Amy Patzlaff, Ph.D.
- Grades: Junior prekindergarten (JPK)–8
- Campus size: 8.5 acres
- Colors: Blue and gold
- Slogan: Creating Scholars and Leaders with Heart
- Team name: Cougars
- Accreditation: Western Association of Schools and Colleges; California Association of Independent Schools
- Publication: ClairbournSchool.com News Blog
- Tuition: $17,500 (JPK) up to $50 ,275 (6th-8th)
- Director of Enrollment Management: Karen Paciorek
- Admissions Associate: Dr. Marianne Ryan
- Website: http://www.clairbourn.org

Founded in 1926, Clairbourn School is a coeducational, private school that includes preschool, kindergarten, elementary, and middle school grades (JPK-8th). Located in San Gabriel, California, the school primarily serves families living in the Pasadena, San Marino, Arcadia areas, but also draws many families from La Cañada Flintridge, Monterey Park, Glendale, Alhambra, Altadena, South Pasadena, and other cities in the San Gabriel Valley. Clairbourn is a member of The Pasadena Area Independent Schools consortium.

== Accreditations ==
Clairbourn School is accredited by the California Association of Independent Schools (CAIS) and the Western Association of Schools and Colleges (WASC).

== Memberships ==
- Pasadena Area Independent Schools consortium
- California Association of Independent Schools
- Western Association of Schools and Colleges
- National Association of Independent Schools
- Independent School Alliance for Minority Affairs
- Council for Religion in Independent Schools

== Curriculum ==
Clairbourn's private school academic program is composed of three segments: preschool (junior pre-kindergarten and pre-kindergarten grades for 3 and 4-year-olds), lower school (kindergarten through 5th grade), and middle school (6th, 7th, and 8th grades).

== School history ==
Clairbourn School was started in 1926 by Mr. and Mrs. Arthur K. Bourne, a prominent San Marino, California, couple.

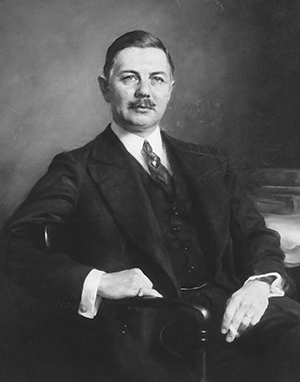
A.K. Bourne, Father of Claire Bourne, Clairbourn School's namesake.

A. K. Bourne (1877–1967) was the second son of Frederick Gilbert Bourne who is widely credited with the success of the Singer sewing machine company. In 1919 when his father died, A.K. Bourne inherited a large portion of the company fortune. A.K. Bourne loved the San Marino, California area and settled there in 1923.

In 1926, Mrs. Emily Bourne desired to provide a school environment for her daughter Claire that recognized and appreciated their religious beliefs, and it was in her San Marino home, that Mrs. Bourne began holding classes in the conservatory for a handful of students. In September, the enrollment went from the original four students to fourteen, and a first grade was added.

In 1927, the school outgrew the Bourne home and was moved to 1261 San Pasqual St. in Pasadena which was the home of Mrs. William W. Butterfield who was appointed director and teacher. In 1928, The school was renamed to “The Claire Louise Progressive Elementary School.” In 1930, when enrollment expanded to twenty-three students, the school soon moved to 245 West California St. in Pasadena. During this time, second and third grades were added to the program and nursery, fourth, fifth, and sixth grades soon followed.

In 1931, the school needed a larger building and leased 3.5 acres on Huntington Drive in San Gabriel. It was also in that year that Mrs. Edwin L. Gardner, began a close relationship with the school that would last for the next thirty-six years. Under her leadership, the school continued to grow adding on seventh and eighth grades and a four-year high school. The school was also renamed “Clairbourn” which combines the first and last names of A.K. Bourne's daughter, Claire Bourne.

By the end of the 1930s, the school dropped the nursery and high school programs and returned to its focus on the primary grades. But then, during WWII, the school changed course and reinstated its nursery-kindergarten program. By 1953, Clairbourn had built a cutting-edge preschool facility to better serve its youngest students. The campus gained 5 additional acres in 1958 when the adjacent Thompson estate was purchased. Over the years, due to a growing demand for Clairbourn's style of private school education, the school opened up its student enrollment as well as staff, administration, and faculty hires to those of all faiths. Today, Clairbourn School has an enrollment of approximately 230 students.

== Campus ==
Clairbourn got its start in the home of San Marino, California resident A.K. Bourne. The home, located at 1861 Lombardy Road, was built in 1923 and was designed by the famous architect Wallace Neff. Classes were held in the home's library. In 1927, due to expanding enrollment, the informal school moved to the home of Mr. and Mrs. William W. Butterfield located at 1273 San Pasqual in Pasadena, California. As enrollment continued to grow, the school moved a second time, to 245 West California Street in Pasadena.

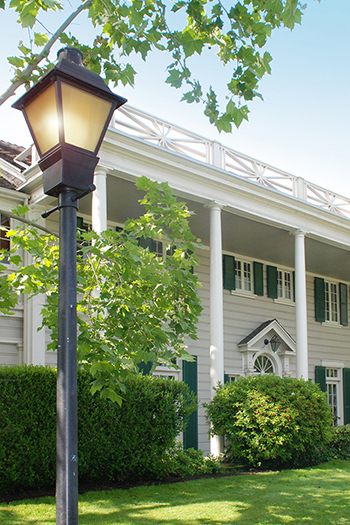
Clairbourn School's Manor House - originally part of the Thompson Estate.

By 1931, the school outgrew its building in Pasadena, and an estate of 3.5 acres on Huntington Drive near San Gabriel Boulevard was leased from Mr. George L. Platt, a successful dairyman of Los Angeles. An additional five acres to the east was acquired in 1958 with the purchase of the Thompson estate, which included a large stately manor house, a swimming pool, and an orange grove.

In 1969, the elementary classrooms were upgraded, and an innovative hexagonal multi-classroom unit called The Gardner Building, was erected. By 1977 more facilities were needed. A multi-purpose game court and six middle school classrooms were added.

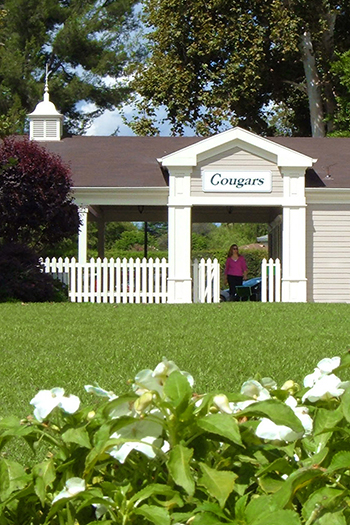
Main Entrance to Clairbourn School

The eighties saw sweeping changes for the school. Clairbourn embarked on a master plan to replace, modernize, and unify the structures on the eight-acre campus. The project included new underground utilities, walkways, lighting, signage, and buildings. During this time, the school added a music building, a new library, an art studio, a gymnasium/multi-purpose building, and new classrooms for the fourth and fifth grades.

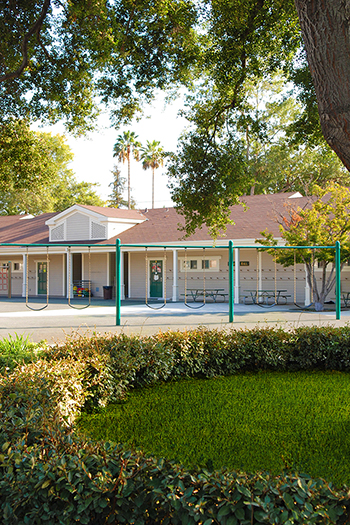
Elementary Classrooms at Clairbourn School

At this time the school replaced the old Gardner Building with new first, second, and third grade classrooms (Randall Hall), built two new Kindergarten classrooms (Victoria Andrew Hall), added new reception and transportation facilities, and installed a large developmental play yard. In 1988, a campus landmark, the giant eucalyptus tree located in the center of campus, blew over in a December windstorm and was replaced by a grove of ginkgo trees.

In 2007, the old preschool building was torn down and construction began on the Seiter Family Early Childhood Center which was occupied in 2008 and is now a state-of-the-art preschool facility.

== Religious heritage ==
Clairbourn School serves students of all faiths and has a staff, faculty, and administration open to all faiths. Clairbourn was originally started in 1926 as a school for students enrolled in Christian Science Sunday schools. Then in 1967, the school opened enrollment to the general public. Today, Clairbourn honors its religious heritage with the school's Morning Assembly gathering. A brief portion of the assembly is called "Chapel," and it includes a simple inspiring message based on Clairbourn's Code of Ethics. These ethics cover honesty, respect, responsibility, spirituality, and citizenship. Common elements of the Chapel portion may include inspirational ideas and quotes, occasional simple Bible stories, a hymn, and the Lord's Prayer.

== Notable alumni and faculty ==
- Coleman Shelton, NFL football player, Super Bowl LVI Champion with Los Angeles Rams
- Hikaru Nishida, Japanese actress and J-pop singer
- Leah Pipes, actress
- Rob Rasmussen, pitcher for the Los Angeles Dodgers
- John Paciorek, Major League baseball player notable for having the "greatest one-game baseball career." He is on staff as Clairbourn's boys’ athletics coach

== Publications ==
Clairbourn School publishes a news blog at clairbournschool.com.

== See also ==
- San Gabriel, California#Elementary schools
