= Tarnak Aw Jaldak District =

District of Zabul Province, Afghanistan

Tarnak aw Jaldak ترنک او جلدک
- District
- Location within Afghanistan
- Country: Afghanistan
- Province: Zabul

Tarnak Aw Jaldak (Pashto: ترنک او جلدک ولسوالۍ) is a district of Zabul province in southern Afghanistan.

== Demographics ==
It has a population of about 16,700 as of 2013. The district is mostly populated by the Nurzai Panjpai tribe of Durrani Pashtuns.

== See also ==
- Tarnak River
- Districts of Afghanistan
