= Zabul Province =

Province of Afghanistan

Zabul Province زابل
- Province
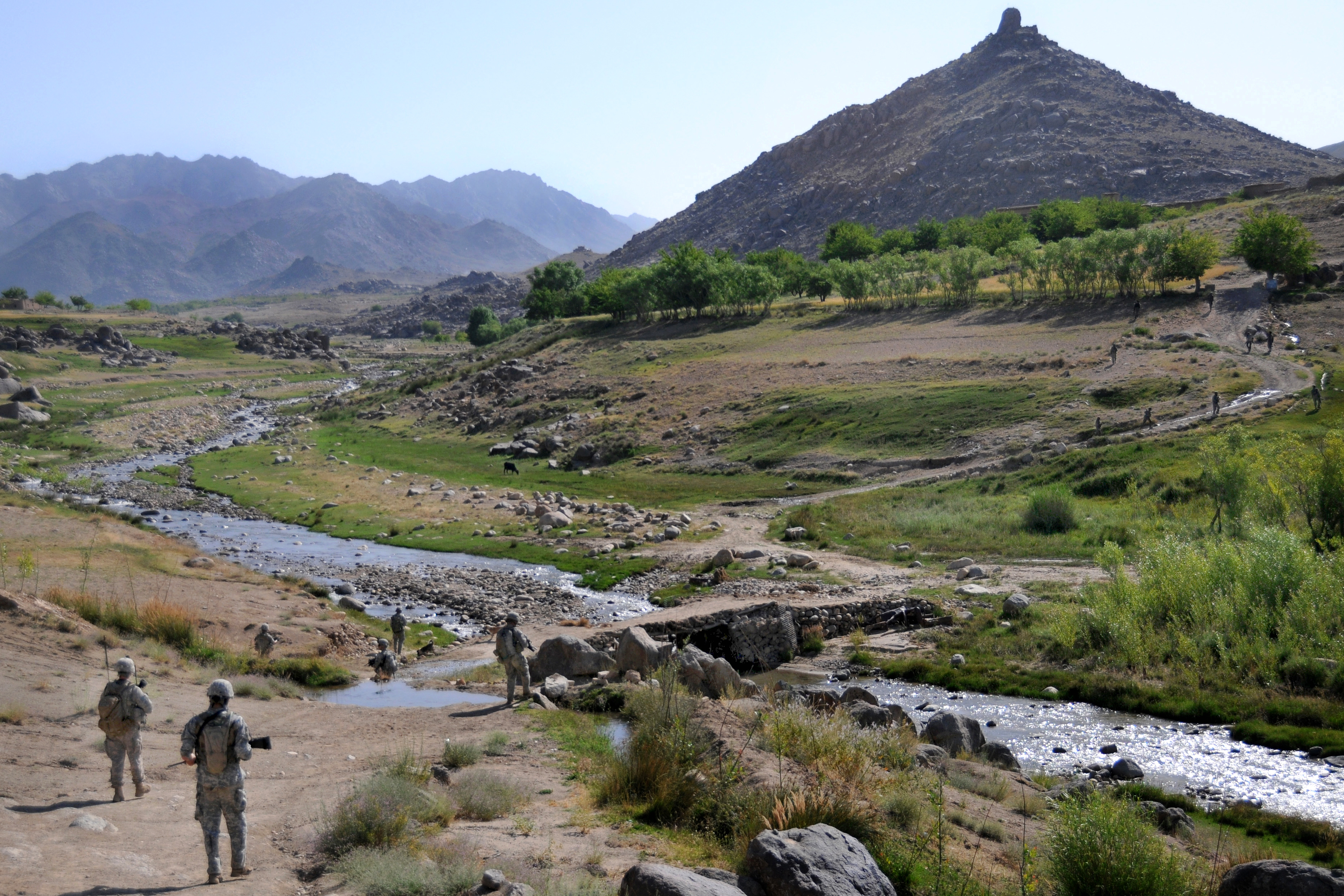
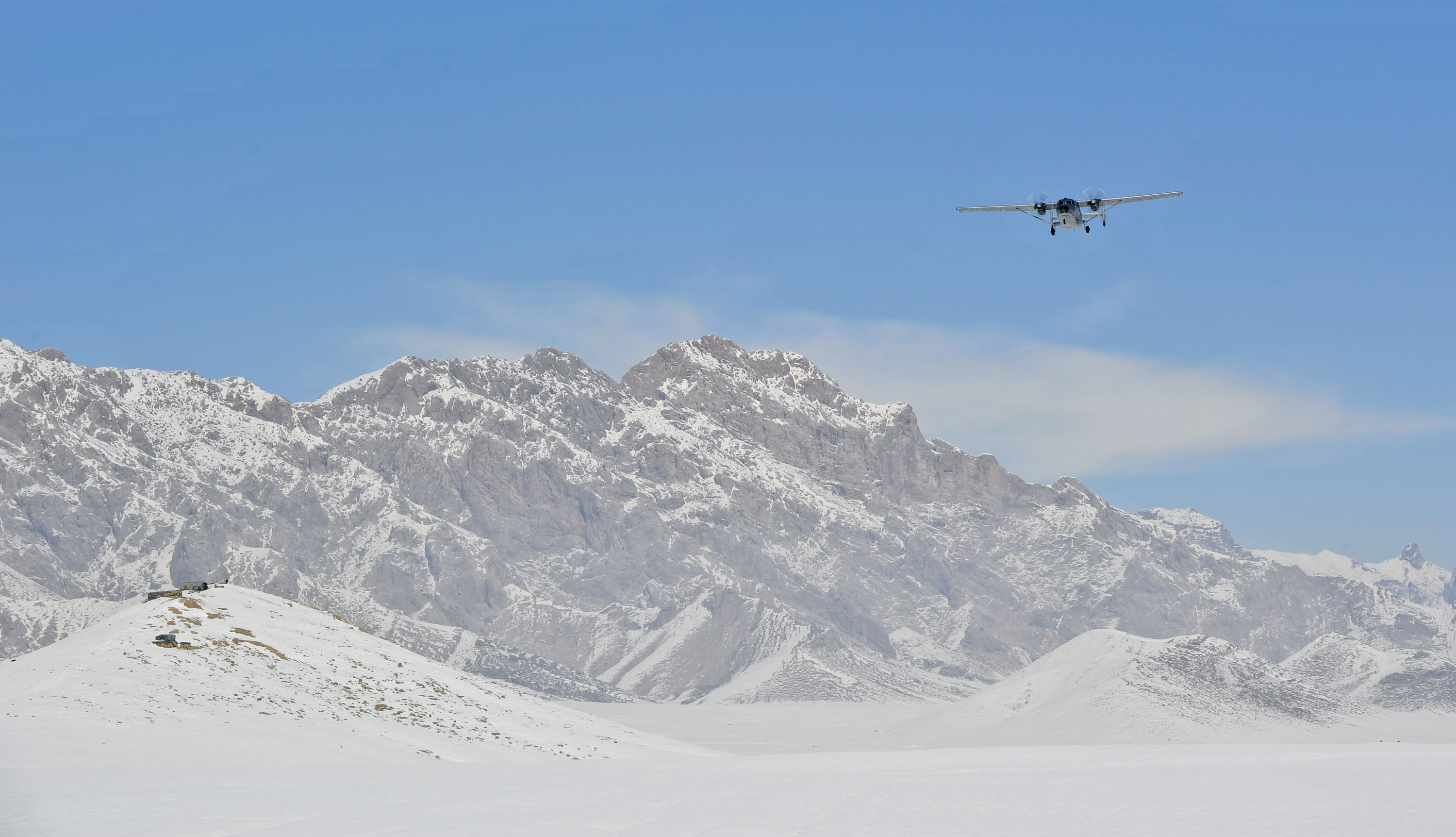
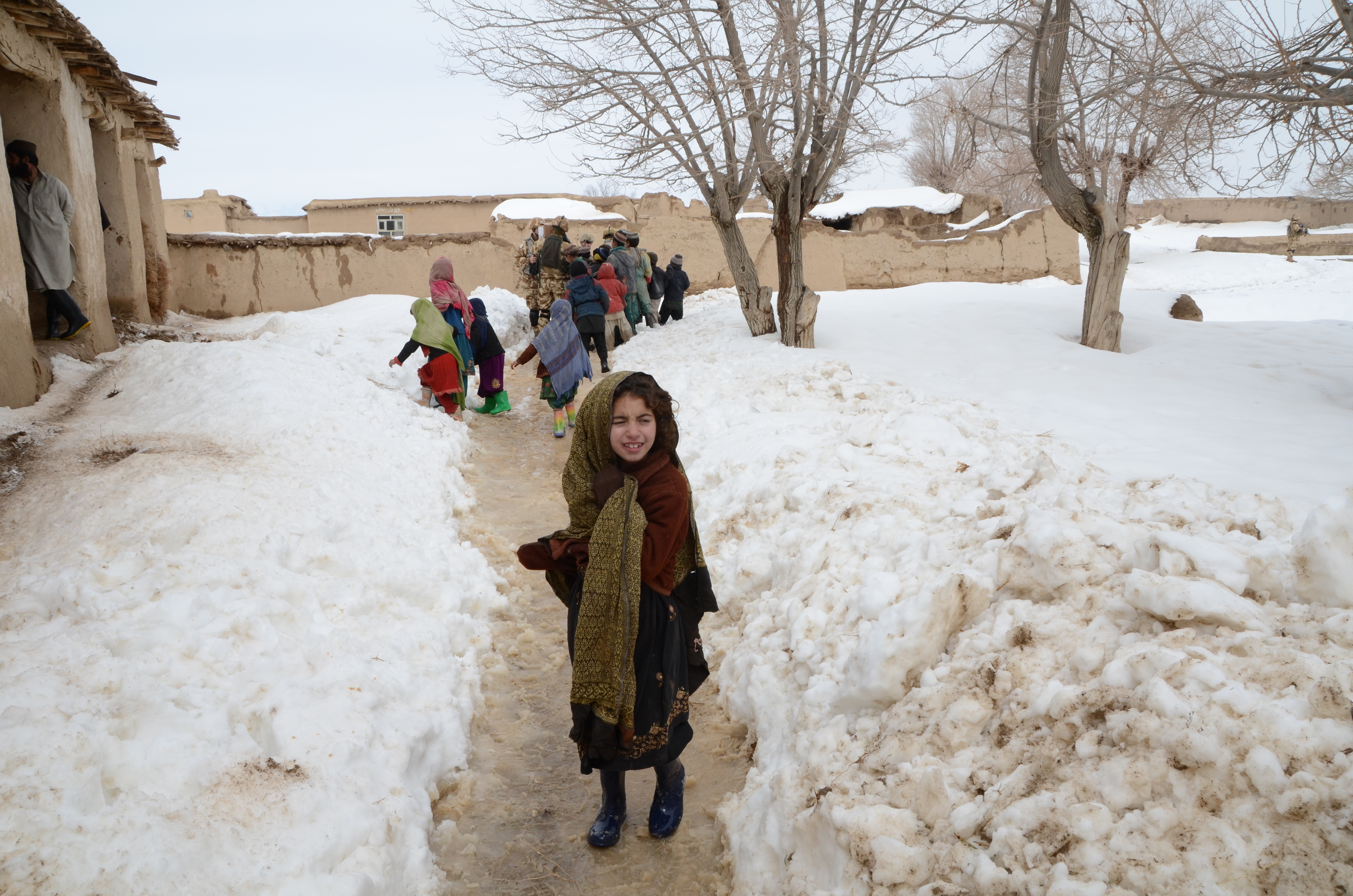
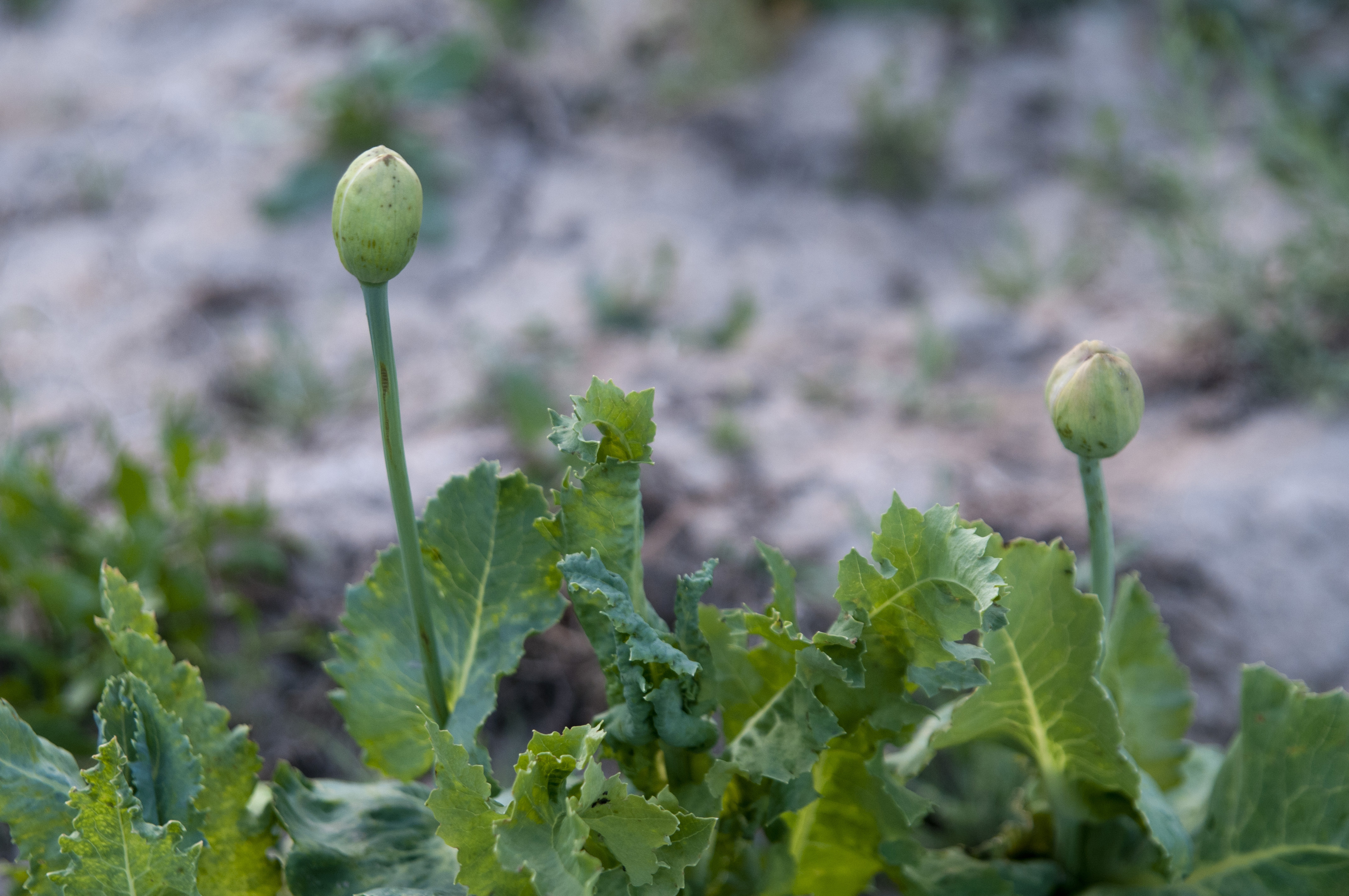
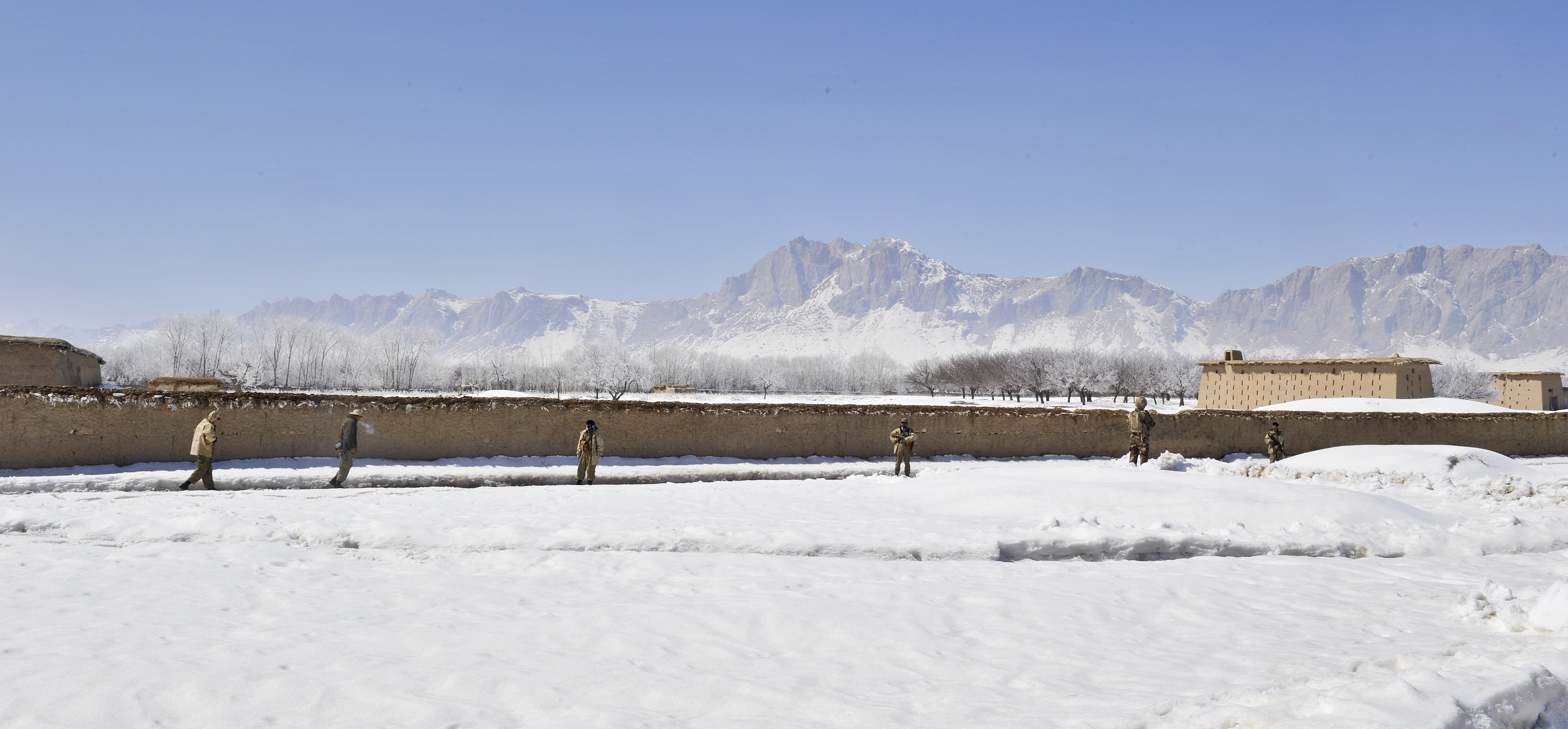
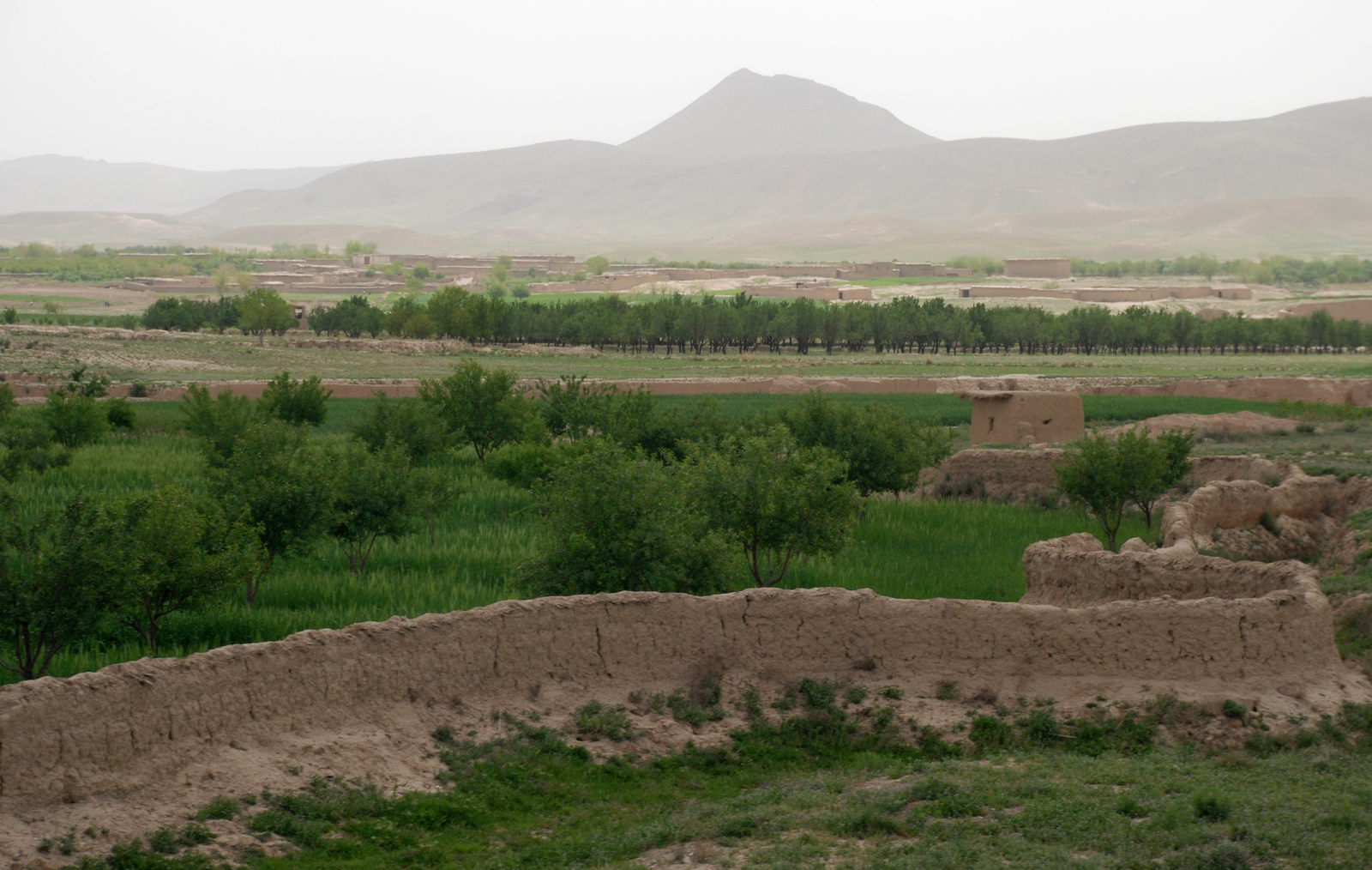
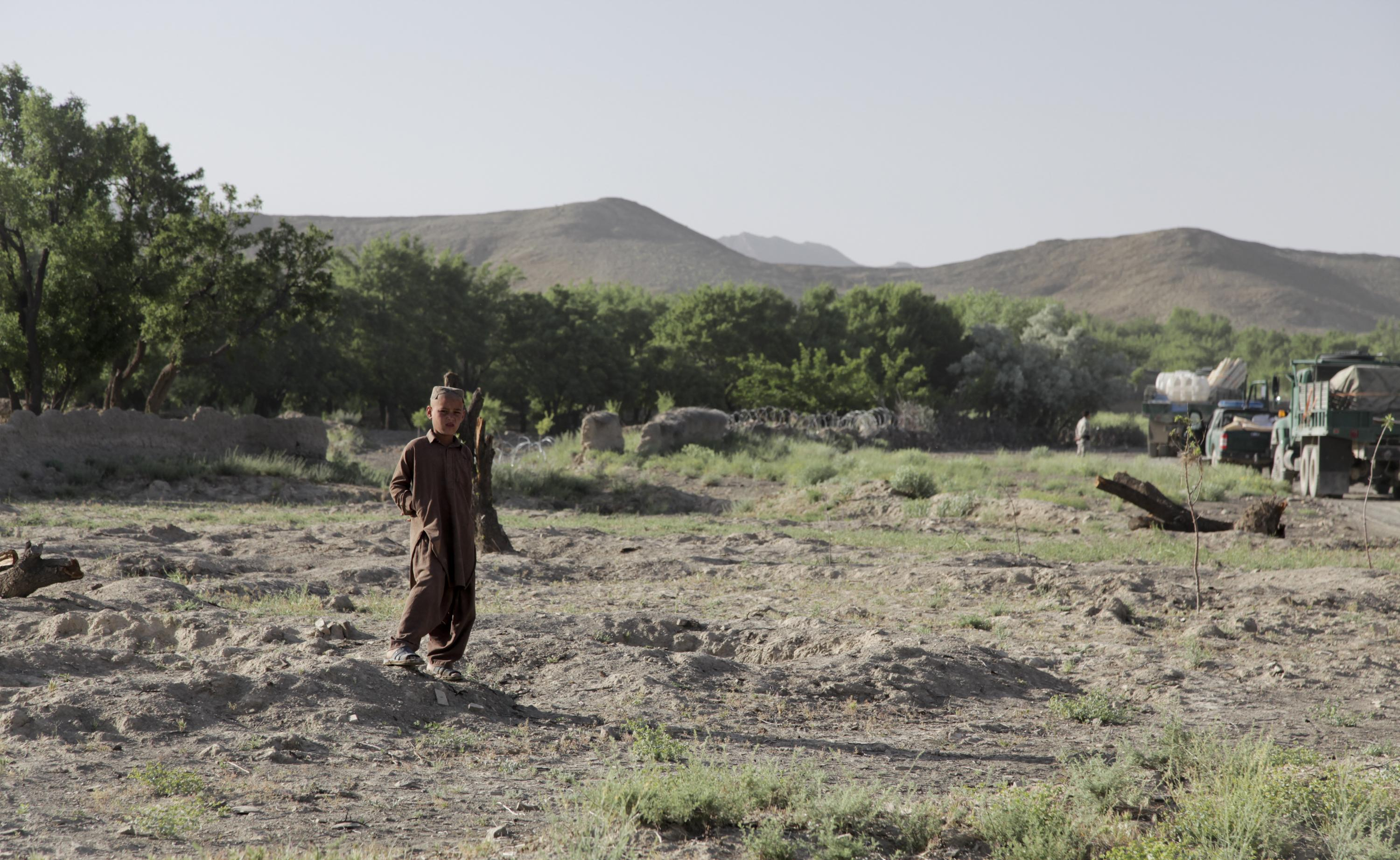
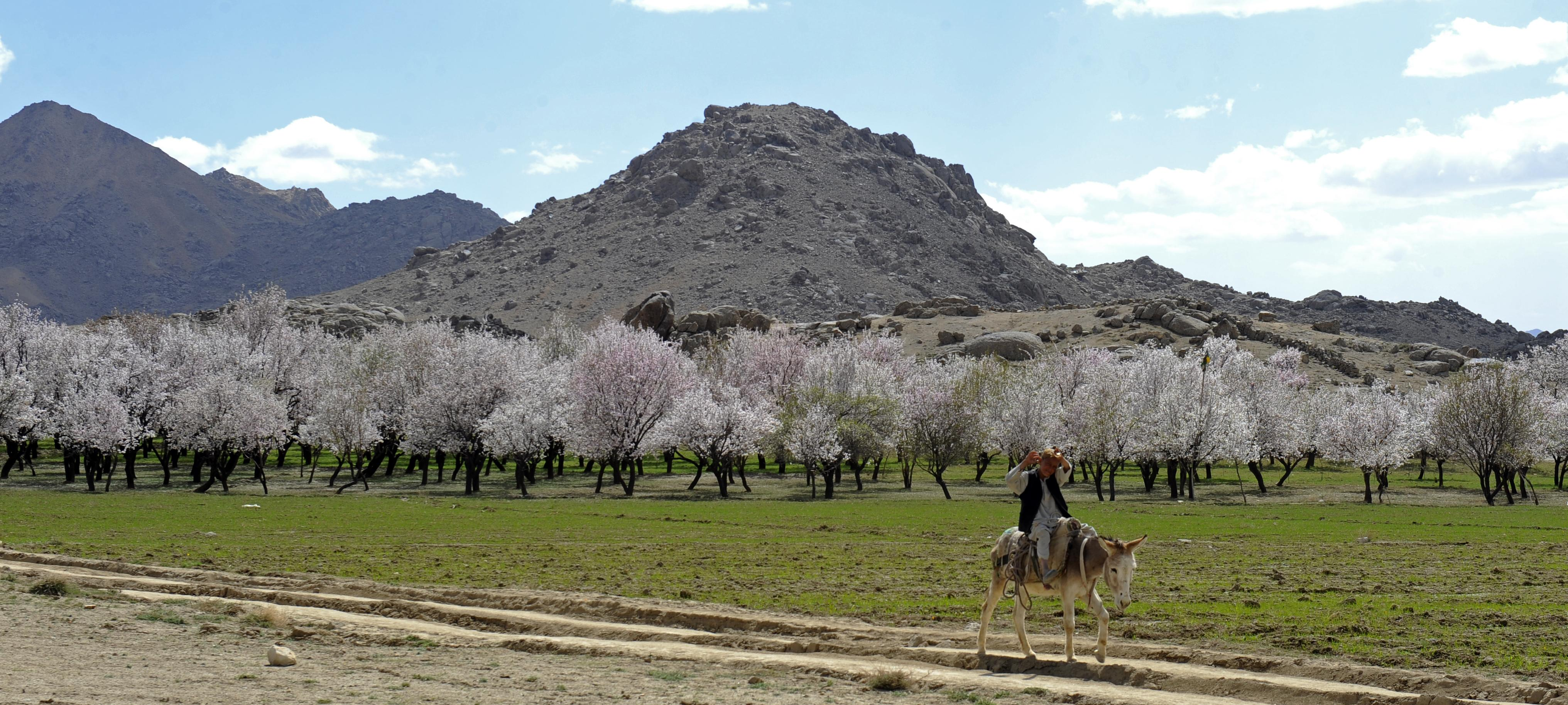
- Landscape of Zabul Province Spīn Ghar Mountains Children attending a jirga Poppy growth in Zabul Shahjoy landscape Qalat Valley Young villager watches coalition troops pass in Shamulzayi Almond trees in Zabul

- Map of Afghanistan with Zabul highlighted
- Coordinates: 32.1°N 67.1°E
- Country: Afghanistan
- Capital: Qalat

Government
  - Governor: Sher Mohammad Sharif
  - Deputy Governor: Faizullah Tamim

Area
  - Total: 17,471 km^{2} (6,746 sq mi)

Population (2021)
  - Total: 391,150
  - Density: 22.389/km^{2} (57.986/sq mi)
- Time zone: UTC+4:30 (Afghanistan Time)
- Postal code: 40xx
- ISO 3166 code: AF-ZAB
- Main languages: Pashto

Zabul Province (Note: Pashto: Pashto pronunciation: [zɑˈbəl]: زابل Dari: Dari pronunciation: [zɑː.bʊ́l]: زابل) is one of the 34 provinces of Afghanistan, located in the south of the country. It has a population of 249,000. Zabul became a separate province from neighbouring Kandahar in 1963. Historically, it was part of the Zabulistan region. Qalat serves as the capital of the province. The major ethnic group are Pashtuns. Primary occupations within Zabul are agriculture and animal husbandry.

According to Iranic legend, Zabul is the birthplace of the hero Rostam.

== Geography ==
A bull walks at the foot of a mountain near Mizan in the southeast of Zabul Province.

Zabul borders Uruzgan in the north, Kandahar in the west and in the south, Ghazni and Paktika in the east. It borders Pakistan in the east.

The province covers an area of 17293 km2. Two-fifths of the province is mountainous or semi mountainous terrain (41%) while more than one quarter of the area is made up of flat land (28%).

The primary ecoregion of the province is the central Afghan mountains xeric woodlands. Common vegetation is listed as dry shrub-land and pistachio. The high mountains of the northern portion of the province are in the Ghor-Hazarajat alpine meadow ecoregion, which is characterized by meadows, willows, and sea buckthorn.

== Administrative divisions ==
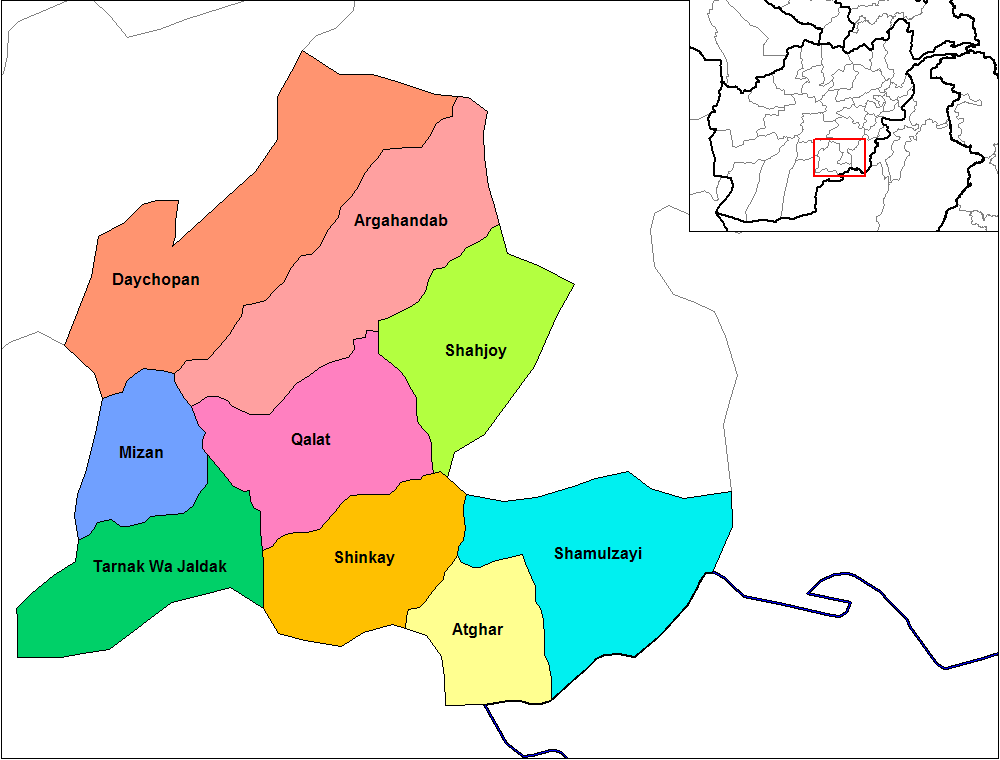
Map of the districts of Zabul as of January 2004, prior to the redrawing of provincial and district boundaries later that year

Districts of Zabul Province
District	Capital	Population (2021)	Area	Pop. density	Notes
Arghandab		36,934	1,490	25	100% Pashtun. Sub-divided in 2005
Atghar		14,059	458	31	100% Pashtun.
Daychopan		44,508	1,491	30	100% Pashtun.
Kakar		27,234	981	28	99% Pashtun, 1% Hazara. Created in 2005 within Arghandab District Also known as Khak-e-Afghan Province.
Mezana		21,623	1,079	20	100% Pashtun.
Naw Bahar		24,534	1,137	22	100% Pashtun. Created in 2005 from parts of Shamulzayi and Shinkay Districts
Qalat	Qalat	44,928	1,914	23	95% Pashtun, 5% Tajik.
Shah Joy		79,889	1,878	43	100% Pashtun.
Shamulzayi		36,515	3,295	11	100% Pashtun.
Shinkay		31,911	1,861	17	100% Pashtun.
Tarnak Aw Jaldak		22,214	1,434	15	100% Pashtun.
Zabul		384,349	17,472	22	99.4% Pashtuns, 0.6% Tajiks, <0.1% Hazaras. (Note: Note: "Predominantely" or "dominated" is interpreted as 99%, "majority" as 70%, "mixed" as 1/(number of ethnicities), "minority" as 30% and "few" or "some" as 1%.)

== Economy ==
In 2006, the province's first airstrip was opened near Qalat, to be operated by the Afghan National Army, but also for use by commercial aviation. Twice weekly service was scheduled by PRT Air between Qalat and Kabul. The airstrip is not paved. The ANA Chief in Zabul is Major General Jamaluddin Sayed

Zabul Province is bisected by Highway 1 and travelers going between Kandahar and Kabul via road typically pass through the province.

On 4 September 2016, at least 38 people were killed and 28 were injured during the September 2016 Afghanistan road crash.

== Demographics ==
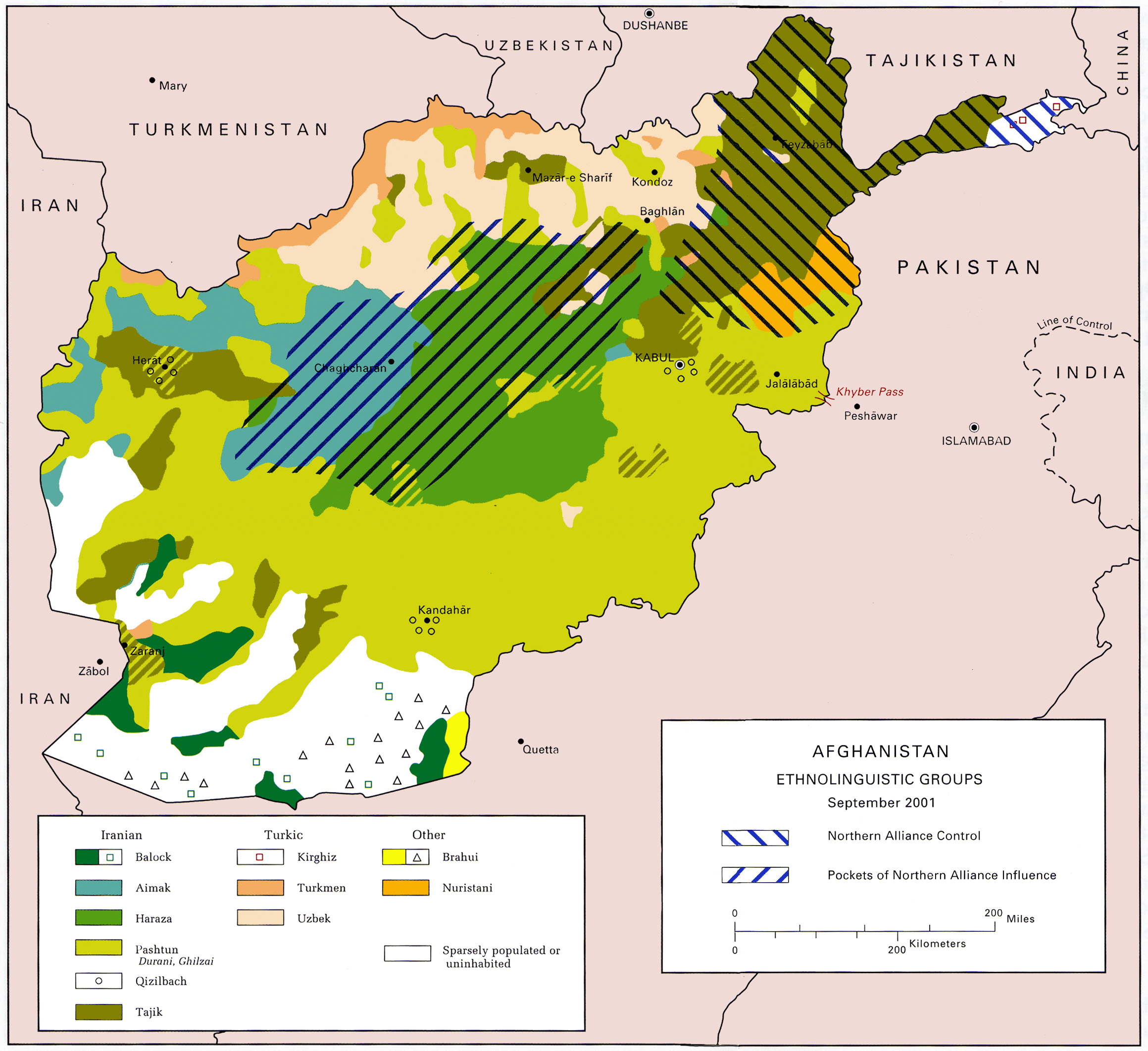
Ethnolinguistic groups in Afghanistan

=== Population ===
As of 2021, the total population of the province is about 391,150, which is mostly a rural tribal society. 60.8% of the population lived below the national poverty line, one of the highest figures of all of Afghanistan's provinces.

=== Ethnicity, languages and religion ===
According to the Naval Postgraduate School, the population is primarily Pashtuns, sprinkled throughout around 2,500 remote villages. Major tribal groups include the Tokhi, Hotak, Nasar, Kharoti, Taraki, Ghilji and the Noorzai and Panjpai Durrani.

Pashto is the dominant language in the area. The people of Zabul are overwhelmingly Sunni Muslim. Primary occupations within Zabul are agriculture and animal husbandry.

Zabul is by many indications one of Afghanistan's most religious conservative provinces.

Estimated ethnolinguistic and -religious composition
Ethnicity	Pashtun	Others	Sources
Period	Pashtun	Others	Sources

2004–2021 (Islamic Republic)	≤100%	≥0%
2020 EU	1st	∅ (Note: incl. Baloch (2nd).)
2018 UN	predominant (Note: excl. Kuchi.)	–
2015 CSSF (Note: Demographic information is based on data from 2015.)	predominant	∅
2015 NPS	majority (Note: incl. Ghilzai (Tokhi, Hotak, Kakar, Kharoti, Sulaimankhel, Taraki, Wardak) and Durrani (Alokozai, Shinwari).)	–
2011 PRT	100% (Note: incl. Tokhi, Hotak, Sulaimankhel, Kakar, Popalzai, Nasar, Shamulzai, Lodi and Kuchi.)	–
2011 USA	∅	–
2009 ISW	overwhelming majority	–

Legend:
- ∅: Ethnicity mentioned in source but not quantified
- –: Ethnicity not mentioned specifically
- Source abbreviations: Empirical sources: –, Government sources: EU – European Union Agency for Asylum, PRT – Provincial Reconstruction Team of the United States government, UN – United Nations Assistance Mission in Afghanistan, Editorial sources: CSSF – Center for the Scientific Study of Families, ISW – Institute for the Study of War, NPS – Naval Postgraduate School, USA – United States Army

=== Education ===
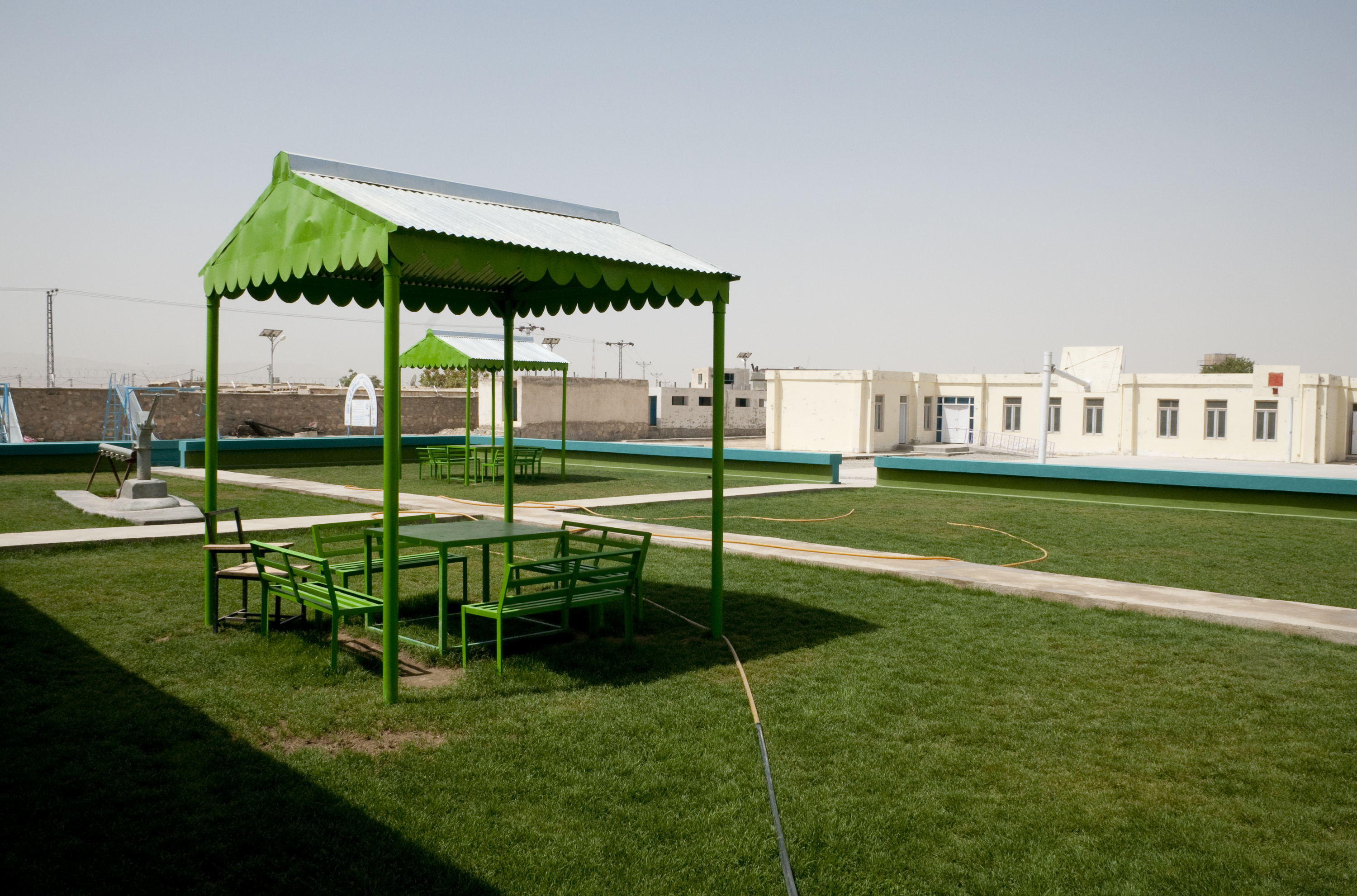
Bibi Khala School in Qalat

The overall literacy rate (6+ years of age) increased from 1% in 2005 to 19% in 2011. The overall net enrollment rate (6–13 years of age) fell from 31.3% in 2005 to 5% in 2011.

=== Health ===
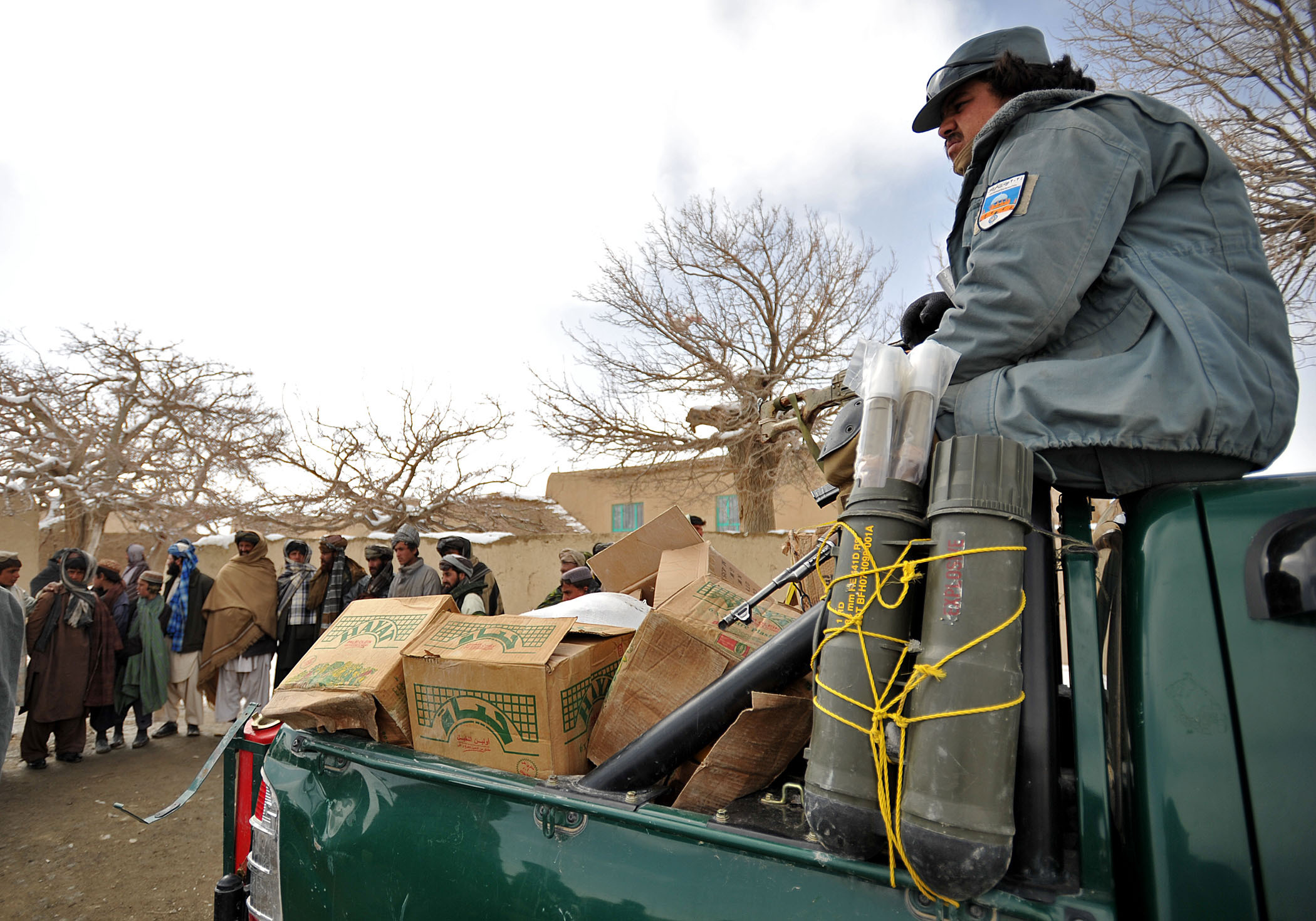
An Afghan National Police officer, right, stands watch over food before distributing it to families Feb. 5, 2012, in Pinzo village, Zabul province, Afghanistan. The food distribution was intended to supplement the villagers winter food reserves from the fall harvest.

The percentage of households with clean drinking water increased from 0% in 2005 to 32% in 2011. The percentage of births attended to by a skilled birth attendant increased from 1% in 2005 to 5% in 2011.

== Culture ==
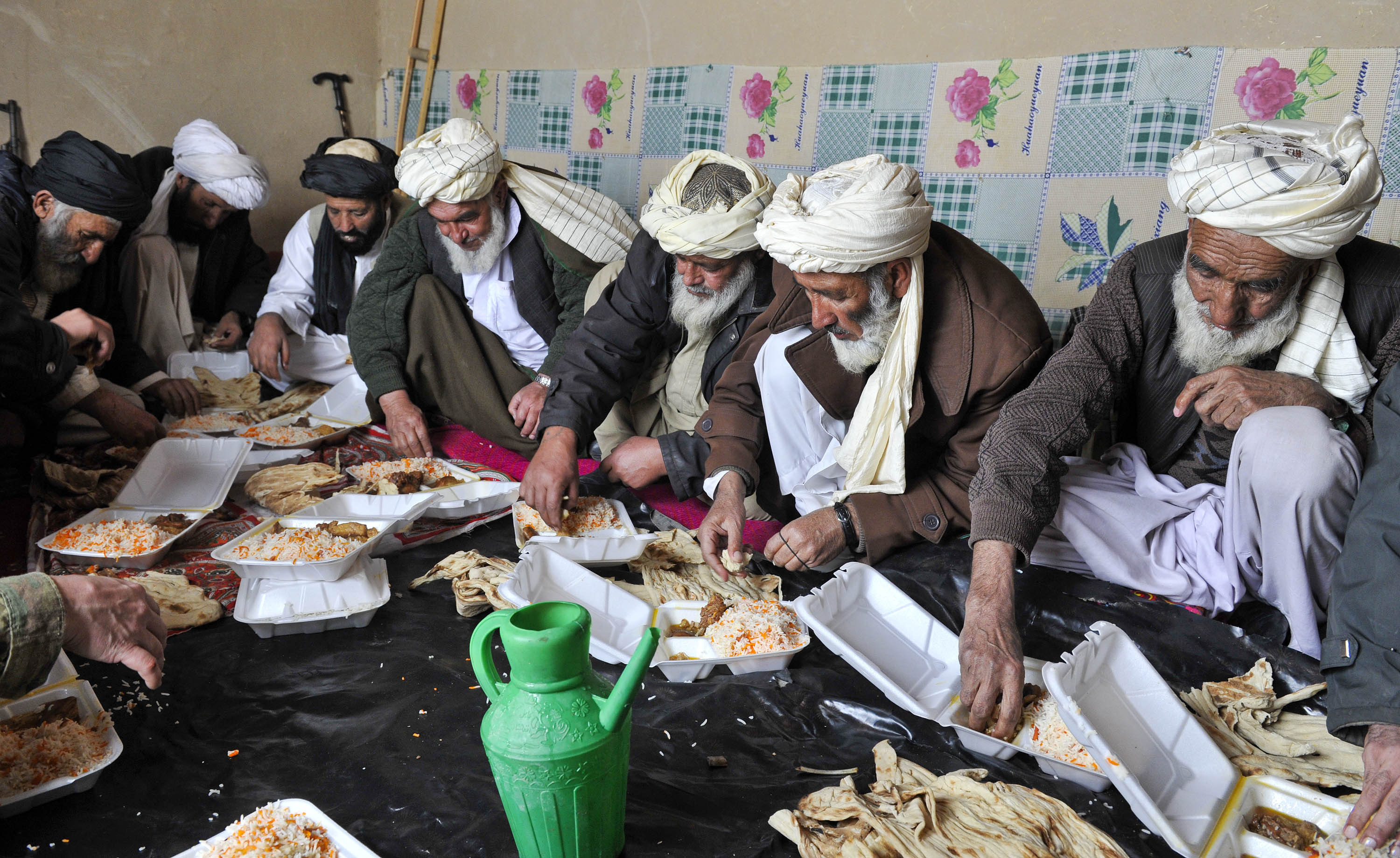
Zabuli elders eating traditional Afghan food on a dastarkhan

=== Sports ===
The province is represented in Afghan domestic cricket by the Zabul Province cricket team.

== Gallery ==
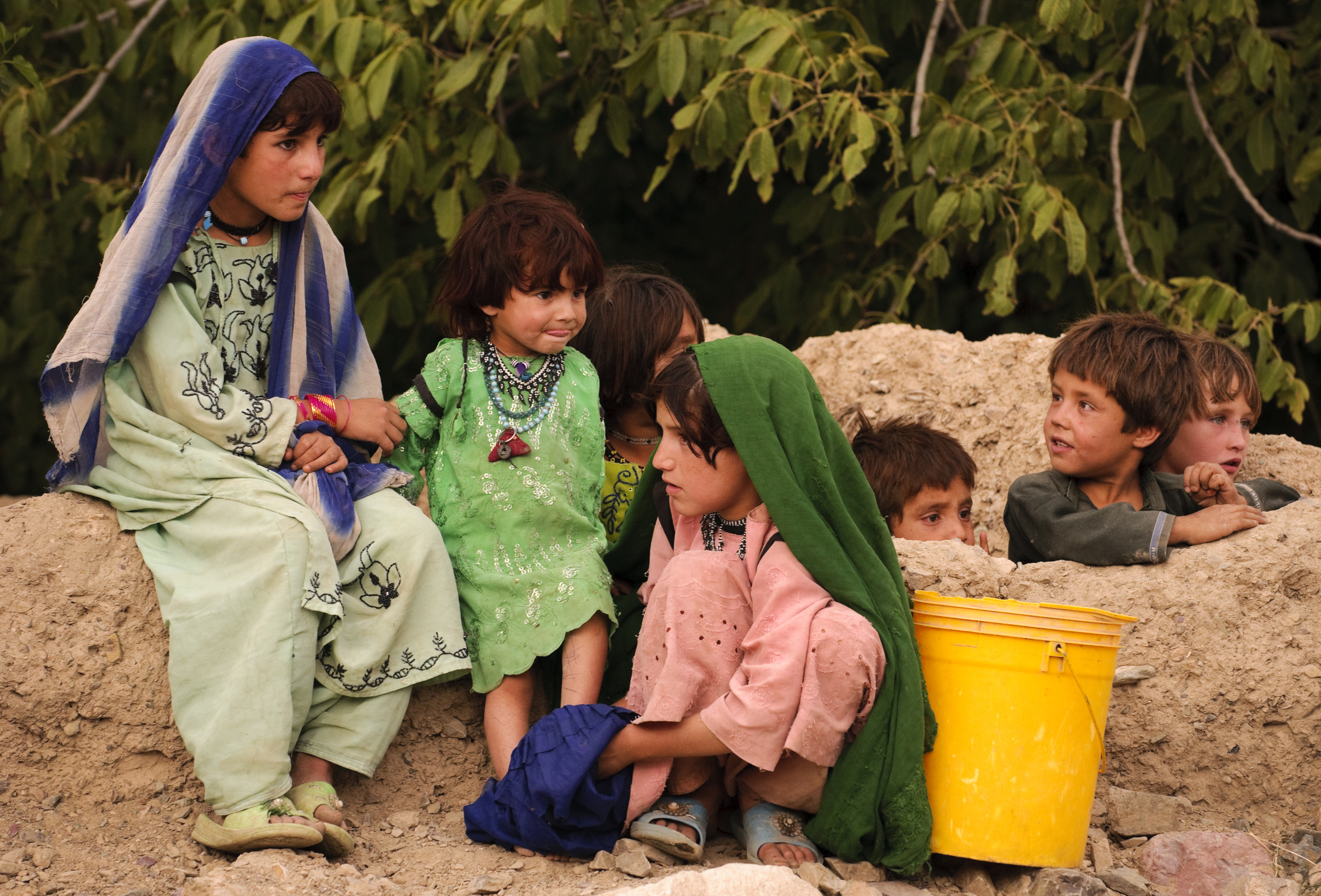
Children in Arghandab

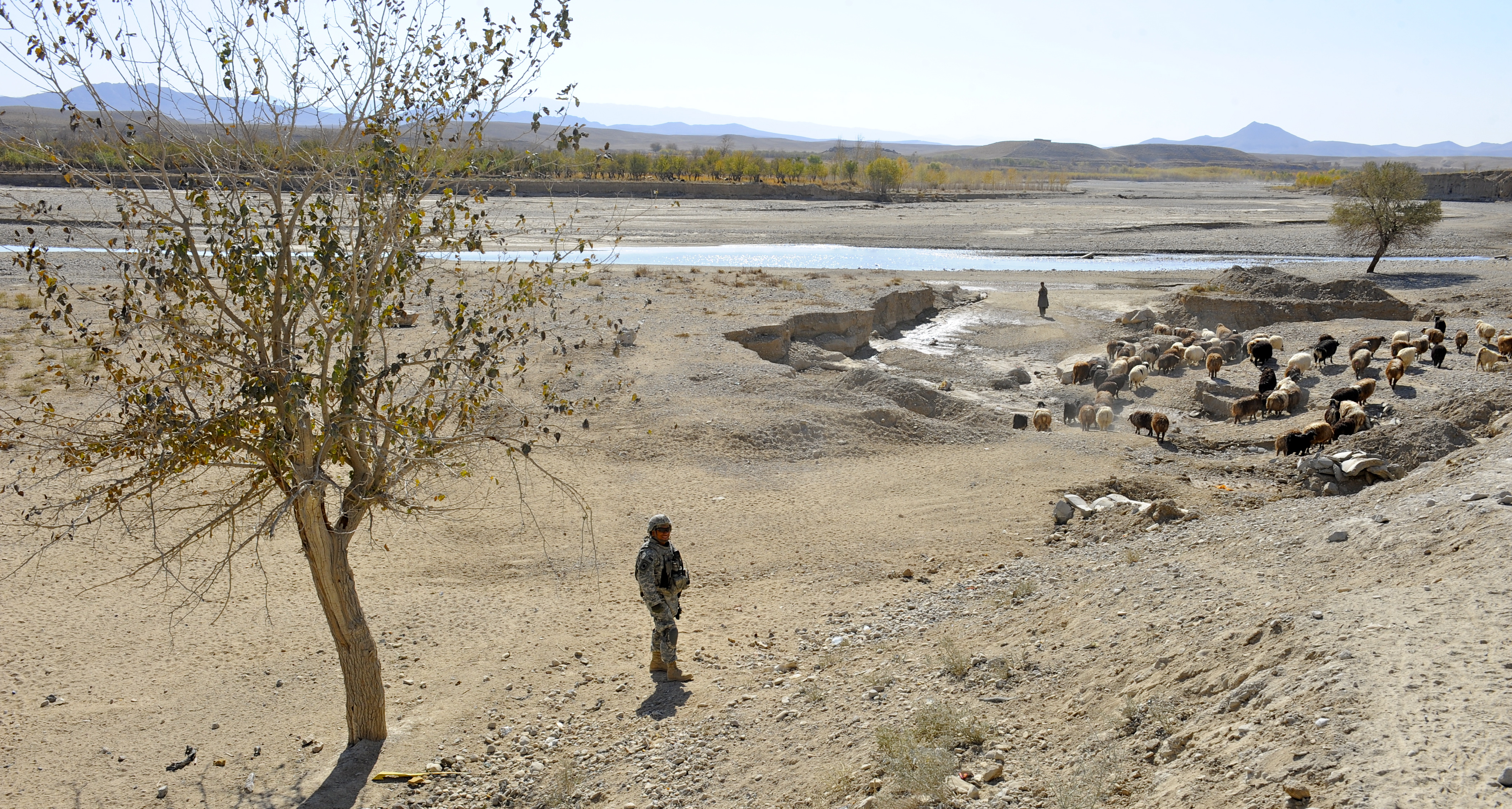
Near a bridge on the Kabul–Kandahar Highway

== Notable people ==
- Alauddin Khalji
- Mullah Omar
- Mullah Yaqoob Akhund
- Rustam-I-Pahlavan
- Jalauddin Khilji
- Sohrab
- Sām
- Zal
- Tegin Shah

== See also ==
- Provinces of Afghanistan
- Zabulistan
- Zabol
- Abu Ali Lawik
