= Tokhi =

Afghan tribe

توخئ

Regions with significant populations
- Zabul, Kandahar and Helmand Province

Languages
- Pashto

Religion
- Sunni Islam

Tokhi (Pashto; توخئ) is a Ghilji tribe found in Afghanistan. Tokhi are one of the largest branches of the Ghilji confederation.

The mythical patriarch of the Ghilji confederacy is Madhnai Nika (مړنئ نيکه) who had three sons [branches]; Thoraan (توران), Tholar (تولر) and Bolar (بولر). The Thoraan has two Branches, the first one being the Hotak (هوتک) and the second one is the Tokhi tribe. They are the largest branches. The Ghilji historically offered strong resistance against many enemies and also ruled over the Persian Asfahan Empire as well as ruling India.

== History ==
The Tokhi hikmat chiefs arose in the Ghilzai revolt of 1801 to 1802 against Shāh Mahmud but were put down and executed. The Tokhi were among the first in the disturbance of British Colonial Occupation during the First Afghan War and were among many troops led to attack the British.

== Subtribes ==
- Barkozai
- Shamulzai

== Notable people ==
- Nāzo Tokhi, Afghan poet of the early 18th century and mother of Mirwais Hotak, founder of the Hotak Dynasty, known as Grandfather of Afghanistan

== See also ==
- Pashtun tribes
