= Russo-Persian Wars =

Series of conflicts between 1651 and 1828

Date	1651–1828 (177 years); 1651–1653 (First), 1722–1723 (Second), 1796 (Third), 1804–1813 (Fourth), 1826–1828 (Fifth)
Location	Caucasus and Iran
Result	Russian victory
Territorial changes	Persia cedes Transcaucasia to Russia by the Treaty of Turkmenchay

Belligerents
Tsardom of Russia (until 1721); Russian Empire (after 1721)	Safavid Iran (until 1736); Qajar Iran (after 1796)

Commanders and leaders
Alexis of Russia; Peter the Great; Catherine the Great; Alexander I; Nicholas I; (Russian Empire) Nikolai Baratov	Abbas II; Khosrow Soltan Armani; Tahmasp II; Agha Mohammad Khan Qajar; Fath-Ali Shah Qajar; Abbas Mirza

Units involved
Army of the Tsardom of Russia; Army of Peter the Great; Imperial Russian Army; Imperial Russian Navy	Army of Iran; Navy of Iran

The Russo-Persian Wars (Russian: Русско-персидские войны, Rússko-Persídskije Vóiny), or the Russo-Iranian Wars (Persian: جنگ‌های ایران و روسیه Janghâ-ye Irân va Russīye), began in 1651 and continued intermittently until 1828. They consisted of five conflicts in total, each rooted in both sides' disputed governance of territories and countries in the Caucasus, particularly Arran (modern-day Azerbaijan), Georgia, and Armenia, as well as much of Dagestan. Generally referred to as Transcaucasia, this region was considered to be part of Persia prior to the 17th century. Between the War of 1722–1723 and the War of 1796, there was an interbellum period in which a number of treaties were drawn up between the two nations themselves and between them and the neighbouring Ottoman Empire; Turkish interest in the Caucasian territories further complicated the Russo-Persian Wars, as the two belligerents started forming alliances with the Ottoman Empire at different points of the conflict. Finally, as a consequence of the Treaty of Turkmenchay, the Persians ceded much of their Transcaucasian holdings to Russia, thus concluding the War of 1826–1828 and resolving their dispute.

== Relations between Russia and Persia ==
=== Economic ===
The earliest records of official relations between Russia and Persia show that in 1521, Shah Ismail I of the Safavid dynasty sent a diplomatic envoy to Tsar Vasili III of Muscovy. Commercial relations, however, were infrequent, and often involved Tatars acting as merchant intermediaries.

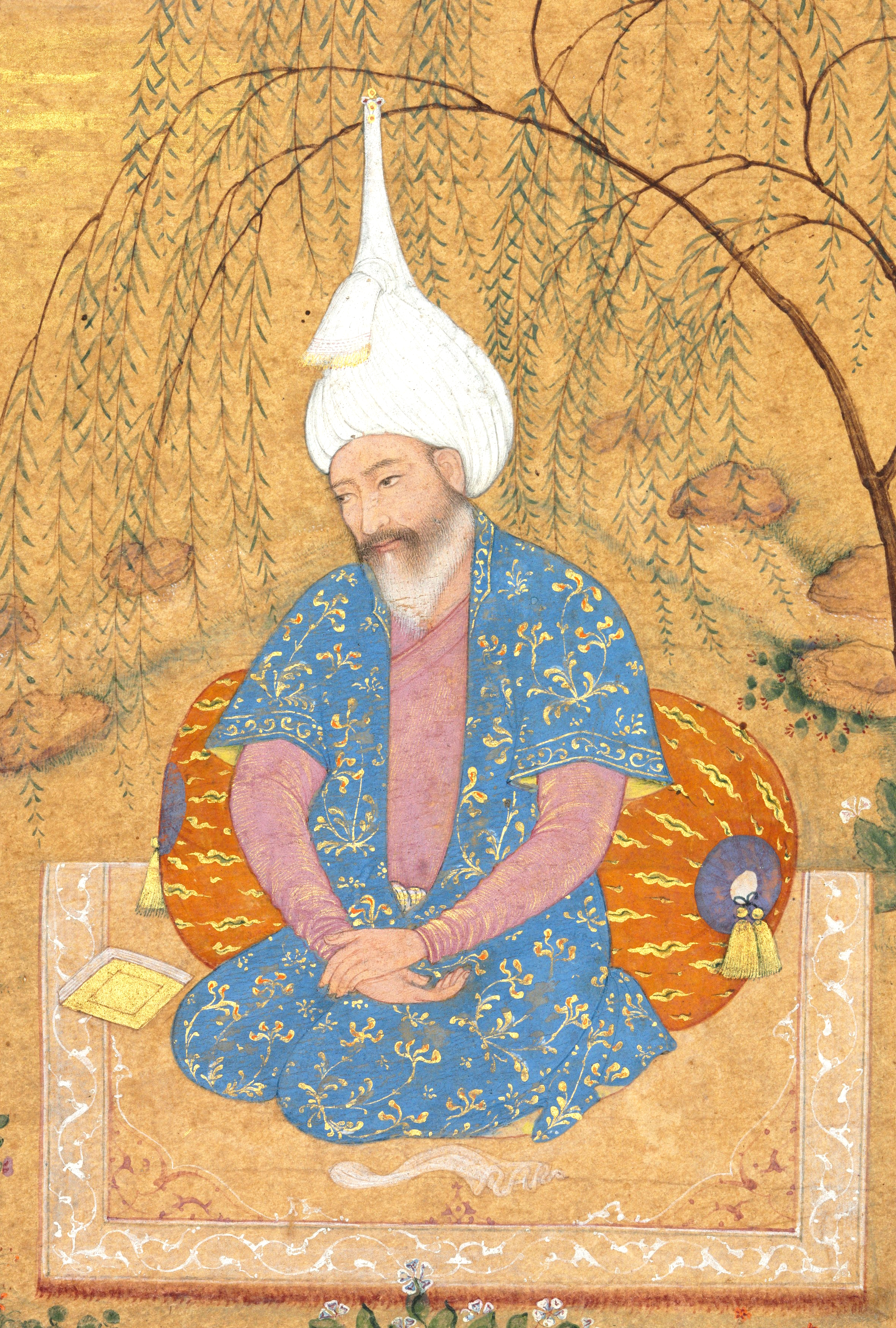
Depiction of Tahmasp I of the Safavid dynasty.

In 1514, the Ottoman Empire instated a commercial blockade against Persia. In order to reduce this pressure from the Ottomans, Shah Abbas I attempted to establish alternate overland trade routes through Russia. An Ottoman attempt to capture Shirvan caused Shah Tahmasp I to send a diplomatic envoy to Moscow in 1552. In 1580, the Ottomans occupied Shirvan and parts of Khartli-Kakheti, including Tiflis. Ottoman forces also threatened Astrakhan, which was key to an important trade route and a Russian commercial centre. Shah Mohammed Khodabanda promised to cede Derbent and Baku to Russia following the liberation of these cities from the Ottoman Empire.

Russia annexed the Kazan and Astrakhan khanates in 1552 and 1556 respectively, to extend the Volga trade route to the Caucasus and the Caspian Sea. Significant points along this trade route were Gilan and Derbent, as the origins of the maritime and overland trade routes between Russia and Persia respectively, and the commercial centres of Astrakhan and Shamakhi. Shamakhi in particular was the site of much merchant trade from Russia: silks, leather, metal wares, furs, wax and tallow. Persian merchants traded in Russia, additionally, reaching as far as Nizhny Novgorod and Kazan, which developed into trade centres. In 1555, the Muscovy, or Russia Company was created for the sole purpose of overland trade with Persia.

In 1562, the province of Shirvan sent an envoy to Russia to establish official trade relations. Shamakhi subsequently did the same in 1653. The first Persians to engage in commercial trade with Russia were Armenians from Julfa, in northern Persia. Julfa was an important link in the Russo-Persian trade route originating in Gilan. In 1604, Shah Abbas I resettled a significant population of Armenians from Julfa to his newly established capital, Isfahan, giving them commercial rights. Shah Abbas extended credit, lowered taxes, and granted religious freedom to this Armenian population.

Throughout the sixteenth century, Persian diplomatic relations were often accompanied by commercial envoys, sending silk and metal wares to Russia. In return, Russia sent furs, falcons and wild animals. In fact, velvet, taffeta and silk from Kashan, Isfahan and Yazd made up over seventy percent of the goods transported to Russia in the sixteenth century.

In 1616, a diplomatic mission to Moscow assured promises of protection over Persian merchants trading in Russia. Persian merchants in Russia often accompanied diplomatic envoys. However, Russian merchants were regularly harassed in Gilan and Ardabil, and Yusuf Khan, the governor of Shamakhi, refused to grant protection to Russian merchants.

Russian map of what was once the Astrakhan Khanate, dated to just before the Fifth Russo-Persian War, 1823

Exports of silk remained high in the early seventeenth century. In 1623, over 2,000 kg of silk was shipped from Astrakhan to cities across the Russian empire. Under Shah Safi I, however, the official exports decreased and were replaced by private merchant trade. In 1634, no trade was recorded, and no wares transported. Two years later, trade was once more brought to a halt, by plague, but trade resumed and grew significantly. In 1676, 41,000 kg of silk was exported from Persia to Russia.

=== Political ===
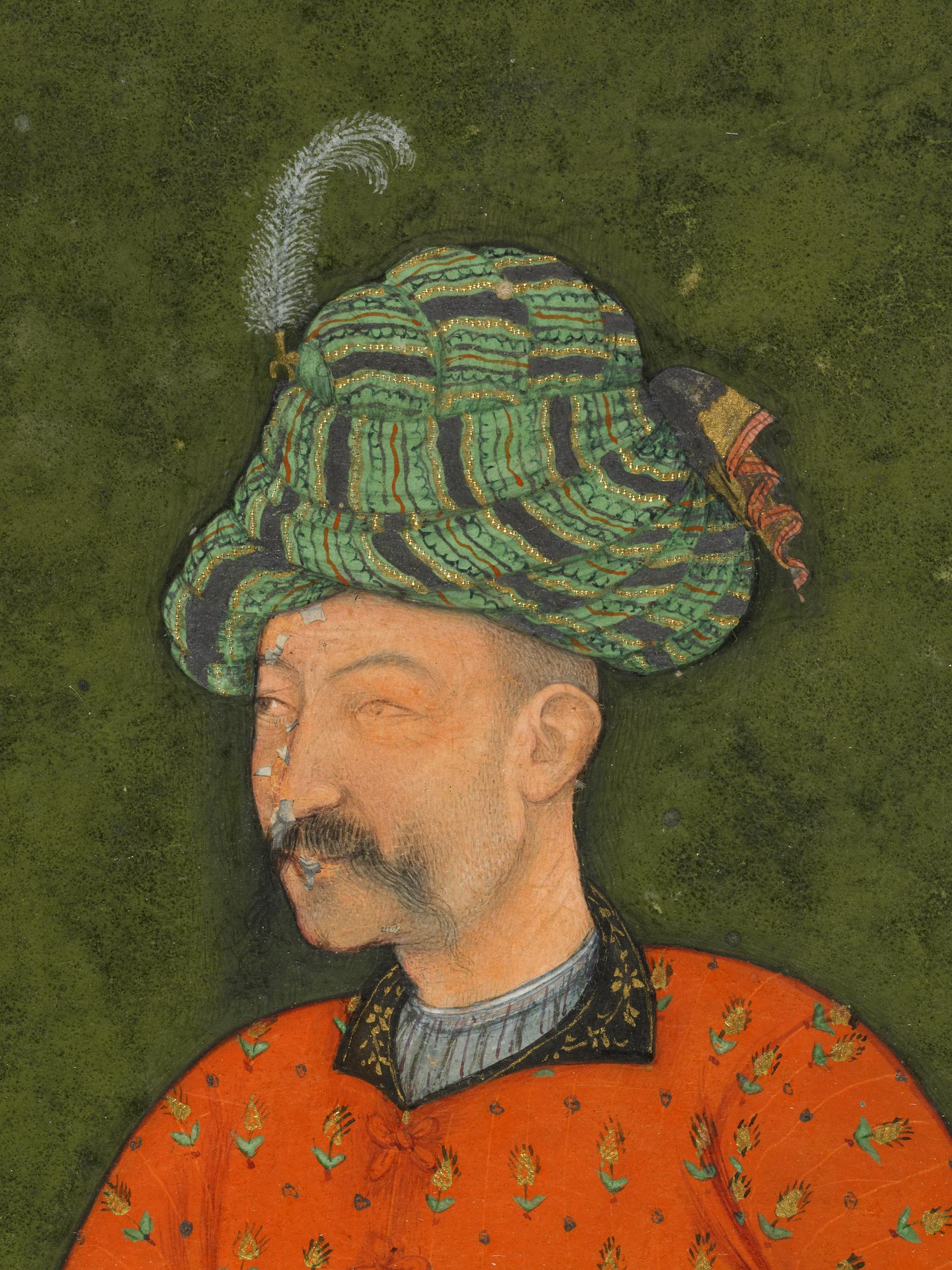
Depiction of Shah Abbas I of the Safavid dynasty, c. 1613–1619

From 1464 to 1465, Tsar Ivan III sent an envoy to Shamakhi seeking an anti-Ottoman coalition. This interest in an anti-Ottoman alliance continued into the sixteenth century, and during the reign of Shah Abbas I, Persia maintained a strong anti-Ottoman foreign policy.

The breakdown of Muscovy in the Time of Troubles preceding the Romanov family’s accession to the Russian throne in 1613 weakened Russia such that Persia turned its foreign policy focus to Western Europe for an anti-Ottoman coalition. Shah Abbas I kept contact with the Habsburgs of Austria in hope of an anti-Ottoman alliance in Hungary.

In the late sixteenth century Russia began a campaign against the Shamkhalate of Tarki, which ruled northern Dagestan and was a nominal vassal of Persia. Russian forces occupied Derbent, Dagestan and Baku, and built fortresses south of the Terek River. The Persians, however, were cautious about challenging these territorial claims in fear of jeopardising an anti-Ottoman coalition.

Between 1598 and 1618, the Russians sent many envoys to Persia in response to requests for military aid against the Ottoman Empire.

In 1612, Shah Abbas I signed the Treaty of Nasuh Pasha with the Ottoman Empire to end the Ottoman-Persian wars. This treaty stipulated Persian neutrality on Russian-Ottoman relations. Trading in Shamakhi decreased sharply following the signature of this treaty, as the Safavid victory over Ottomans in 1618 negated the need for Russian assistance.

In the 1630s there were renewed hostilities between Persia and the Ottoman Empire until the signing of the Peace of Zuhab in 1639, which resulted in diplomatic caution from the Persians, out of a desire to not antagonise the Ottoman Empire.

== First Russo-Persian War ==
In 1645, there was unrest between the Russian Cossacks and the Lezgins, who were considered Persian subjects. These tensions were centred primarily along the Georgian-Dagestani border. A Russian-supported candidate gained leadership of Dagestan over a Persian candidate.

In 1647, Khosrow Khan, the governor of the Shirvan province, complained to the governor of Astrakhan that Cossacks from Astrakhan and Tarki had committed a series of robberies. He threatened to confiscate the goods of Russian merchants in Shamakhi, the capital of the Shirvan province, and to pursue military action against the Cossacks. Russian authorities protested this action, and requested the shah punish Khosrow Khan. The shah took no action and in 1649, Khosrow Khan sent another letter restating his warning. The tension between the countries escalated when, in 1650, Cossacks robbed a caravan carrying wares from Shirvan and Dagestan, and several people were killed.

The Russians expanded a garrison on the Sulak River, and constructed several more on the Terek River, including one garrison in support of the deposed ruler of Khartli-Kakheti, Teimuraz. This expansion into Persian territory and support for Teimuraz angered Shah Abbas II, as Teimuraz had been deposed by the shah.

In 1653, the shah ordered the governors of Ardabil, Erivan, Karabakh, Astarabad and parts of Azerbaijan to send troops to the aid of Khosrow Khan. Further troops were contributed by the governor of Derbent, the Shamkhalate of Tarki and the ruler of the Kara Qaytaq. These troops drove the Russians from the fortress and set fire to it.

That same year, an envoy led by Prince Ivan Lobanov-Rostovsky of Russia travelled to Persia to request that the governor of Shamakhi not meddle in Dagestani affairs, that compensation be given for the losses suffered, and that all Russian merchants be released.

This conflict over Georgia and Dagestan affected trade relations between the countries. In 1651, 138 bales of Persian silk were in storage in Astrakhan due to a lack of demand.

=== Treaty of 1717 ===
Artemy Petrovich Volynsky was sent as an envoy to Isfahan to conclude a commercial treaty that would give Russia a monopoly on the Persian silk trade. This mission also gathered intelligence about Persian resources, geography, infrastructure, military and other strengths. He was further instructed to highlight Russia as Persia's ally and the Ottoman Empire as their enemy.

The Persians became hostile to the envoy party when a Russian expedition led by Prince Bekovich-Cherkassky landed on the eastern shore of the Caspian Sea at Khiva.

Volynsky reported to the tsar that Persia was on the verge of collapse. He furthermore recommended that the provinces of Gilan, Mazandaran and Astarabad be annexed by Russia due to their capacity for silk production.

== Second Russo-Persian War ==
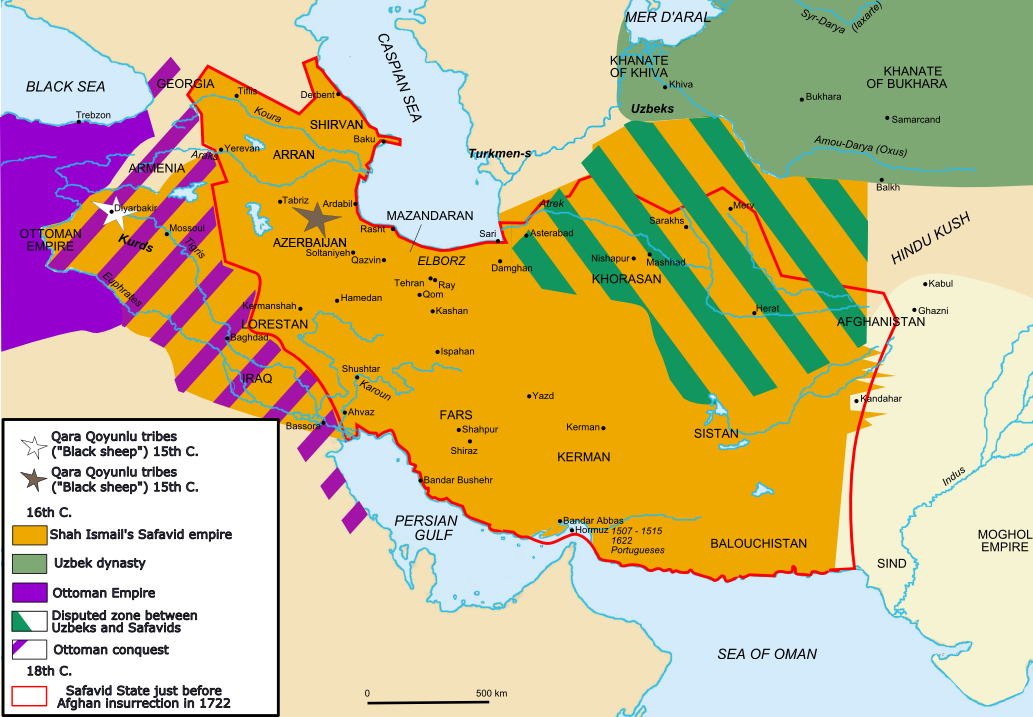
Map of Persian territorial control prior to the Second Russo-Persian War (1722–1723).

In January 1721 the Pashtun Afghans, led by Mirwais Hotak and subsequently Mahmud Hotak, began a campaign against the Persians over the ruling of Qandahar. The Afghans, with an army of 25,000 men, invaded Persia and attempted to seize Kerman. They were unable to hold the city and were similarly unable to capture the nearby city of Yazd. Mahmud subsequently moved to camp outside the city of Gulnabad, ten miles from the Persian capital, Isfahan.

Daud Khan, the Sunni Muslim chieftain of the Lezgin tribe, had been detained in Derbent for inciting rebellion, but was released in August 1721 following the initial attack by the Afghans in the hope that he would raise an army to support the shah. Daud Khan and his Lezgin followers sacked the city of Shamakhi in August 1721, killing thousands of Shia Muslims and killing several wealthy Russian merchants. Artemy Volynsky, who was now the governor of Astrakhan, urged Tsar Peter I to send troops to intervene in the rebellion. Vakhtang VI, ruler of the Persian vassal state and Georgian kingdom of Kartli, contacted Peter to give his support for Russian advances into the Caucasian territories. Daud Khan then sought the protection of the Ottoman sultan.

Following the Afghan victory over the Persians at the Battle of Gulnabad on 8 March 1722, Mahmud Hotak and his army besieged Isfahan. Mirza Tahmasp, the son of Shah Husayn, escaped Isfahan with 600 men and fled to Qazvin. From Qazvin, Tahmasp then was forced to flee to Resht, followed by Afghan forces. The governor of Resht contacted Tsar Peter requesting aid, as did Tahmasp, who sent an envoy, Ismail Beg, to Astrakhan.

Tsar Peter and the Russian troops arrived in Astrakhan on 29 June 1722. An envoy was sent to inform Shah Husayn that the Russian forces were there to aid in subduing the rebels, rather than to declare war. Peter proposed to render aid in subduing the Afghans and the Lezgin rebellion, and to ensure that the Ottoman Empire did not take advantage of the situation and invade. The envoy was also instructed to inform Shah Husayn that this aid would only be given provided Persia ceded certain provinces to Russia. The envoy, however, did not pass on the message concerning the cessation of these provinces.

Vakhtang VI supplied 30,000 men to the army, and the Armenians sent 10,000 more. From Astrakhan, the troops then proceeded to attack Persian fortresses on the western coast of the Caspian Sea, and occupied the fortress at Derbent. The Russians then seized Baku and Salyan in the Shirvan province, Lankaran in the Talesh province, and Anzali in the Gilan province, which were significant provinces in the silk production industry.

The Ottoman sultan sent an emissary to Peter warning that further incursion on Persian territory would constitute grounds for declaring war on Russia.

In September 1722, many Russian ships were lost in a storm, and an epidemic killed a significant portion of the horses in the Russian cavalry. Russian troops withdrew to Astrakhan, with a few garrisons remaining in the Shamkhalate of Tarki, Baku and Derbent. The Georgian and Armenian troops were left to subdue the rebels.

On 23 October 1722, Shah Husayn surrendered Isfahan to the Afghans, and abdicated in favour of Mahmud Hotak. Peter offered to aid Tahmasp in gaining back his throne from Mahmud.

On 3 November 1722, 14 ships sailed from Astrakhan to Anzali, a port near Resht. Russian forces entered Resht under the pretext of helping the city. In 1723, the governor of Resht requested Russian troops leave as aid was not required. The troops did not leave, however, and were besieged in their barracks. On 28 March 1723, a company of Russian troops escaped the siege and the Persians besieging the barracks were attacked from both sides, with over 1,000 men killed.

Ismail Beg, Tahmasp II’s envoy, arrived in St Petersburg on 30 July 1723 to inform Peter of Tahmasp's ascension to the throne, and to request aid against the rebels and the Afghans.

== Interbellum ==
=== Treaty of St. Petersburg (1723) ===
The Treaty of St Petersburg was signed between the Russian Empire and the Persian Empire on 23 September 1723 to conclude the Second Russo-Persian War. Under the terms of the treaty, the tsar would accord the shah friendship, and aid in fighting against rebels. In return, Persia would cede Derbent, Baku, and the provinces of Mazandaran, Gilan, Shirvan and Astarabad. Ismail Beg, Tahmasp's ambassador in Russia, signed the treaty but the shah refused to ratify it when the text of the treaty was sent to him in April 1724.

=== Treaty of Constantinople (1724) ===
The Treaty of Constantinople was signed between the Ottoman Empire and the Russian Empire on 24 June 1724, in order to mitigate the political crisis caused between the two empires following the signature of the Treaty of St Petersburg. The Ottoman Empire ceded Azerbaijan, Armenia and Georgia under the terms of the treaty, and Russia was permitted to retain Mazandaran, Gilan and Astarabad.

It was specified that should Persia refuse to acknowledge the treaty, both Russia and the Ottoman Empire would take action to enforce the treaty by installing a puppet ruler on the throne of Persia.

=== Treaty of Hamedan (1727) ===
The Treaty of Hamedan was signed between the Ottoman Empire and the Afghan Hotaki dynasty in October 1727. The Hotaks agreed to cede Zanjan, Sultaniyah, Abher, Teheran to the Ottomans in exchange for Ashraf Hotak being declared as Shah of Persia.

=== Treaty of Resht (1732) ===
The Treaty of Resht, signed by the Russian Empire and Safavid Persia on 21 January 1732, gave Persia a portion of territories ceded in 1723 in the Treaty of St Petersburg. Russia ceded the Astarabad, Gilan and Mazandaran provinces to Persia. Under the terms of the treaty it was also specified that in the case that Ottomans relinquished Caucasian territories back to Russia, Russia would also cede Derbent and Baku. The treaty also ensured free trade for Russian merchants in Persia, and that the Russian ambassador was permitted to reside in Persia.

=== Treaty of Ganja (1735) ===
The Treaty of Ganja was signed in March 1735 between the Russian Empire and Persia. The treaty gave Persia the remainder of territories ceded in 1723: Derbent, Baku and the surrounding Shirvan province, and Tarki. Furthermore, it marked the Terek River as the boundary between Russia and Persia.

== Third Russo-Persian War ==
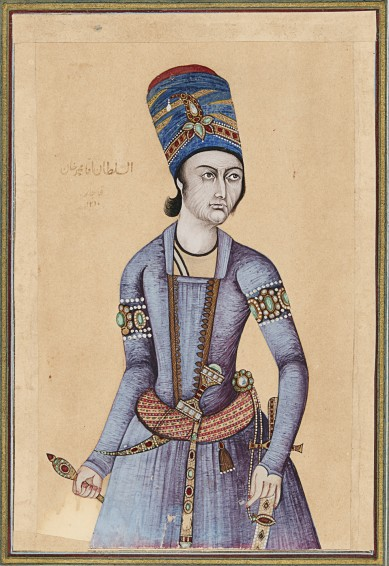
Depiction of the Persian Shah Agha Mohammed Khan Qajar, 1815

In 1781, a Russian commander, Count Voinovich, led a flotilla intended to wrest the islands and port city of the Astarabad province from Agha Mohammed Khan and the Persians. However, Agha Mohammed Khan arrested and deported all parties involved in the expedition.

In 1783, Erekle II of Khartli-Kakheti agreed to become a vassal state of the Russian Empire in return for Russian protection. This was formalised in the Treaty of Georgievsk on 24 July 1783. Persia still considered Khartli-Kakheti to be its vassal state. Following the signature of the Treaty of Georgievsk, the Vladikavkaz fortress was built on the Terek River.

The governor of the Gilan province, Hedayatollah, sought Russian support against Agha Mohammed Khan, and Russia stipulated the vassalage of Anzali in return for this support. Russia supported Morteza Qoli Khan, the brother and rival of Agha Mohammed Khan, on the proviso that following his ascension to the throne he would cede Anzali, Gilan, Mazandaran and Astarabad to the Russians.

Agha Mohammed Khan viewed the Treaty of Georgievsk as defiance on the part of Erekle II and Khartli-Kakheti and moved toward Tiflis in 1795 in an attempt to restore Persian dominion. Agha Mohammed Khan raised an army of 60,000 men, intending also to retake Karabakh, Ganja, Shirvan and Khartli-Kakheti. He divided his force into three, simultaneously attacking Shirvan, Erivan, and the fortress at Shusha. At Shusha, the siege lasted from 8 July to 9 August 1795. The governor of Shusha eventually surrendered, however denied the army entry to Shusha. Agha Mohammed Khan negotiated with the governor to gain access to the road to Tiflis through Shusha. Agha Mohammed Khan subsequently moved from Shusha to occupy Ganja. 40,000 men marched from Ganja to Tiflis on 10 September 1795 and took the city.

By the end of 1795, Agha Mohammed Khan had captured Tiflis and dominated northern Persia. In the invasion, thousands of Georgians were massacred, and 15,000 citizens taken into captivity and sent as slaves to Persia. Erekle II fled from Tiflis.

Tsarina Catherine II of Russia began a campaign in 1796 to overthrow Agha Mohammed Khan in favour of Morteza Qoli Khan. Russian forces, consisting of 20,000 men, began to march from Kizlyar in April 1796 to Derbent, which was seized on 10 May 1796. Russian troops occupied Talesh, Salyan, Derbent, Baku, Shamakhi and Ganja by June 1796. Following the death of Catherine II, Tsar Paul I recalled all troops from the Caucasus.

== Fourth Russo-Persian War ==
The Kingdom of Kartli-Kakheti (Georgian: ქართლ-კახეთის სამეფო), which existed under Persian suzerainty until the Russian annexation, c. 18th century

On 18 January 1801, it was agreed that Khartli-Kakheti would become a protectorate of Russia. On 12 September 1801, Tsar Alexander formally announced the decision to annex Khartli-Kakheti after Persia attempted to reassert suzerainty. In 1804, following civil unrest, Fath Ali Shah had new silver and gold coins minted in Erivan, Ganja and Nukha to show proof of suzerainty over these provinces.

From 1802 to 1804, Russian forces captured and subdued the Georgian kingdom of Imereti, an Ottoman vassal state, in addition to Mingrelia, Guria, and many of the khanates surrounding Georgia. Ganja was occupied and sacked, and 3,000 citizens were killed. Persia considered the khanates surrounding Georgia to be its vassal states, and Fath Ali Shah took the Russian progression into these territories as justification for the declaration of war.

On 23 May 1804, Fath Ali Shah demanded Russian troops be withdrawn from Persian territory in the Caucasus. This request was refused, precipitating a declaration of war from Persia. The Russian troops proceeded to march to the Erivan province and besieged the capital, Erivan on 1 July. The siege of Erivan, however, failed as the Russian forces ran out of provisions. Subsequently, the Persians suffered defeats at Leninakan and Erivan, and they retreated to regroup.

In 1805, the khanates of Shaki, Shirvan and Karabakh formally recognised Russian authority. Russian forces also attacked Baku, Resht, Quba and Talesh. In 1806, Russian forces defeated a Persian attack in Karabakh, and captured Derbent and Baku.

Following these losses, the Persian troops were defeated in many significant locations in the ensuing years. In 1806, Russian forces captured Karakapet, and then Karababa in 1808. They also occupied Ganja in 1809, and Akhalkalaki in 1810.

In 1810, the Persians, allied with the Ottomans, attacked Tiflis from Nakhichevan but failed to capture the city. Their retreat was hindered by the Russian occupation of Megri on the Aras River.

On 12 August 1812, 20,000 Persian men captured the fortress of Lankaran in the Talesh province and proceeded to the Aras River, attacking Russian troops positioned there in October. The Russians defeated the Persians in October 1812 at Aslanduz, in the Ardabil province, when the Persian artillery was destroyed and Persian forces were forced to retreat to Tauris. The Persians were later defeated also at Lankaran on 13 January 1813.

=== Treaty of Gulistan (1813) ===
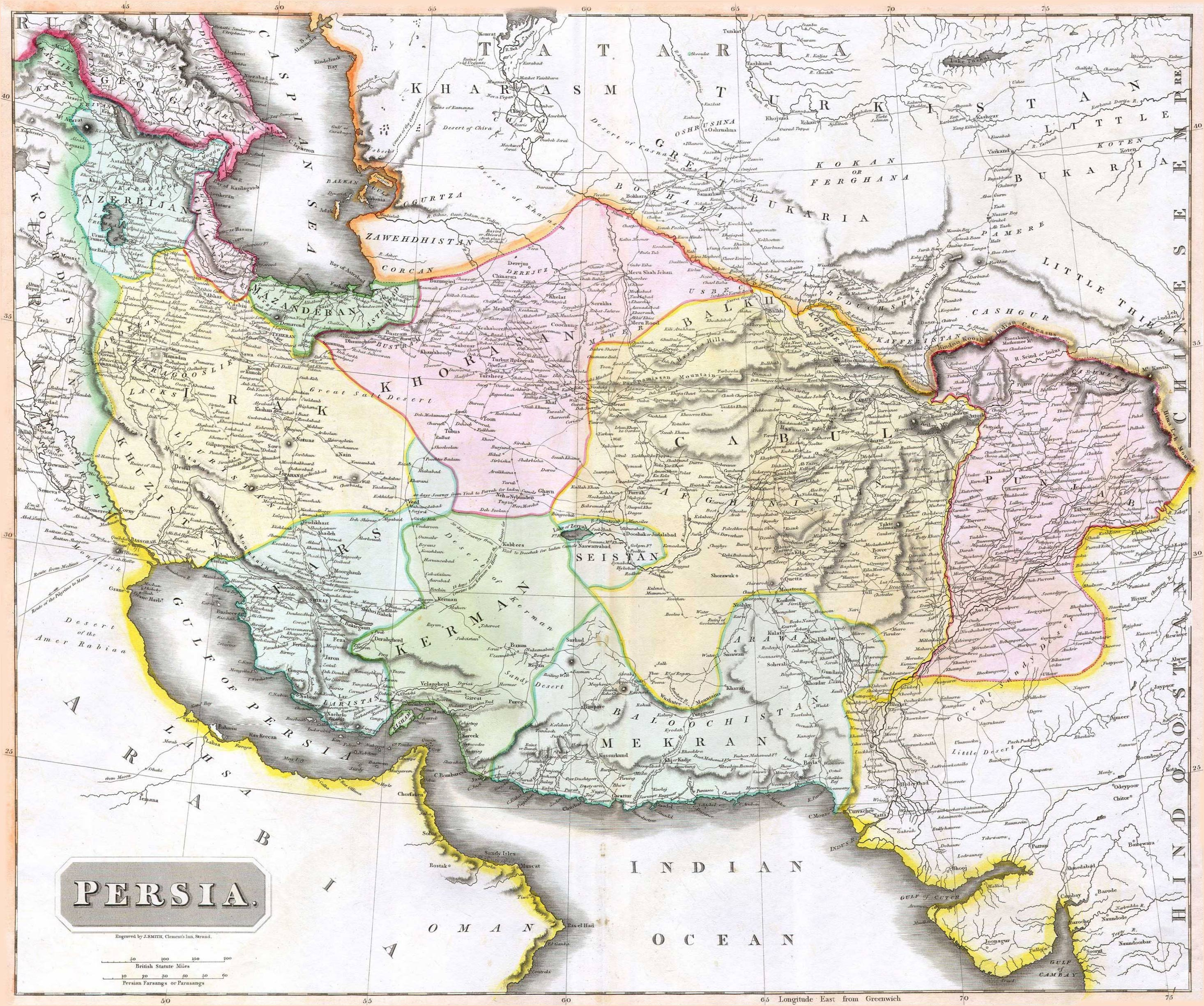
Map of Persia after the Treaty of Gulistan was signed with Russia, 1813

The Treaty of Gulistan was signed on 24 October 1813 between the Russian Empire and Persia as a conclusion to the Fourth Russo-Persian War. Persia ceded all territories north of the Aras River, including Dagestan, Mingrelia, Abkhazia, Derbent, Baku, Shaki, Quba, Talesh, Shirvan, Karabakh and Ganja. The treaty additionally permitted Russia exclusive military rights to the Caspian Sea and trade rights within Persia.

== Fifth Russo-Persian War ==
The death of Tsar Alexander in 1825 led to the false belief in Persia that civil war had broken out in Russia and that the Caucasian kingdoms and tribes had rebelled. In May 1826, Russia occupied Mirak, in the Erivan province of Persia. This action stood in opposition to the Treaty of Gulistan.

In July 1826, Abbas Mirza ordered an attack on Russian territories in the Caucasus, besieging Shusha and Ganja (renamed Elisavetpol by Russia), and proceeding toward Tiflis. A second force also attacked Gyumri. Persia invaded the Karabakh and Talesh provinces, which had been ceded to Russia in the Treaty of Gulistan. Citizens in these provinces surrendered the cities of Lankaran, Quba and Baku to Persia. A Russian attack subsequently defeated the Persians at the Shamkhor River and Ganja in September 1826 and they retreated to Tauris.

In October 1826, Russian forces besieged Erivan. Following this, they successively seized Nakhichevan, Abbasabad, Meren, Urmiya, and Ardabil in 1827. The Russians defeated the Persians in 1827 when they captured Erivan and Tauris and the Persians were forced to sue for peace.

=== Treaty of Turkmenchay (1828) ===
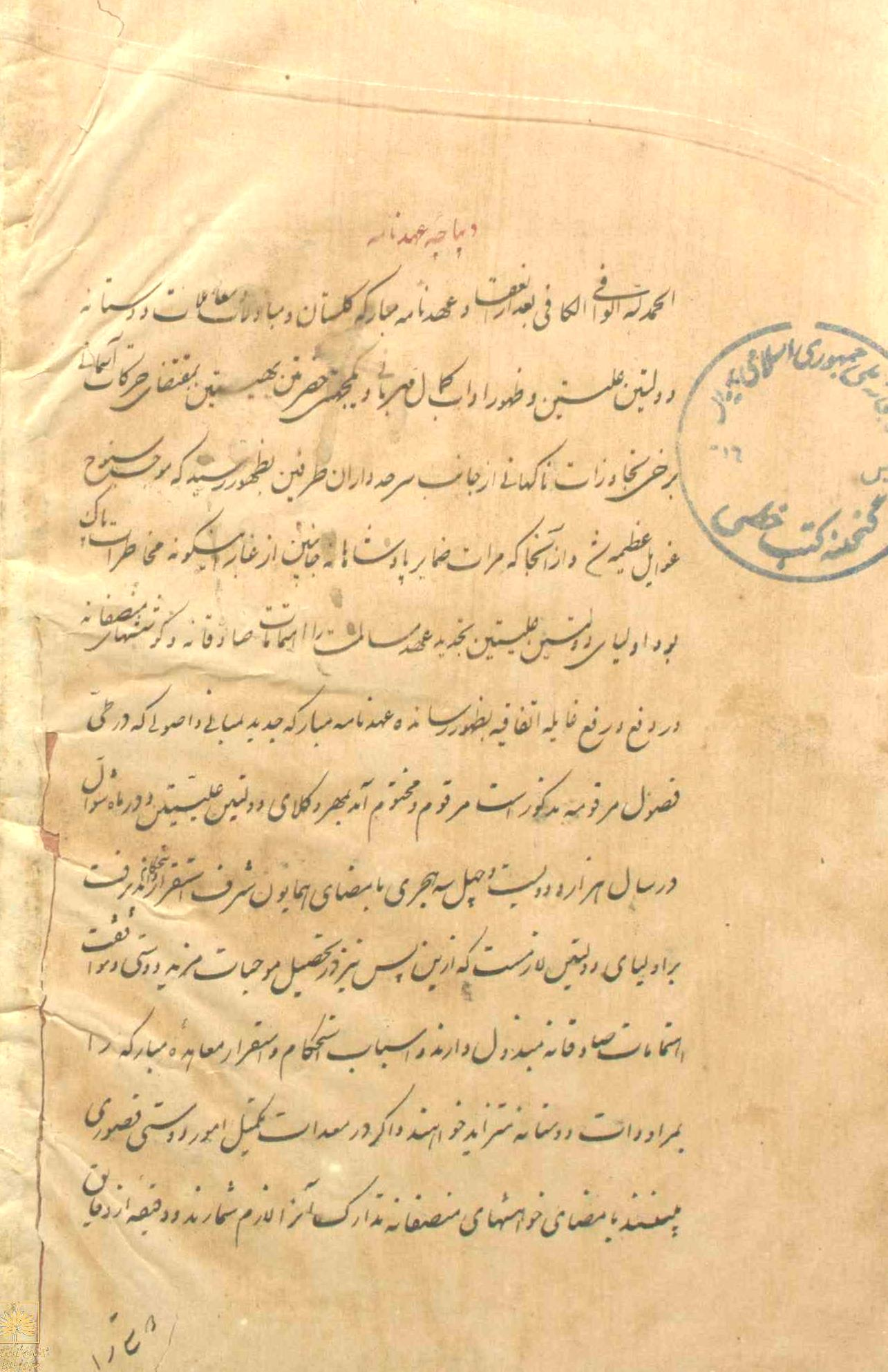
First page of the Treaty of Turkmenchay between Persia and Russia, 1828

The Treaty of Turkmenchay was signed on 21 February 1828 between the Russian Empire and Persia. Under the treaty, Persia ceded the Erivan, Talesh and Nakhichevan khanates. The Aras River was established as the new border between the countries. Persia was also required to pay 20 million rubles in silver in indemnification. The treaty continued to allow Russia an exclusive right to a naval presence on the Caspian Sea and exempted Russian subjects from Persian jurisdiction.

== Aftermath ==
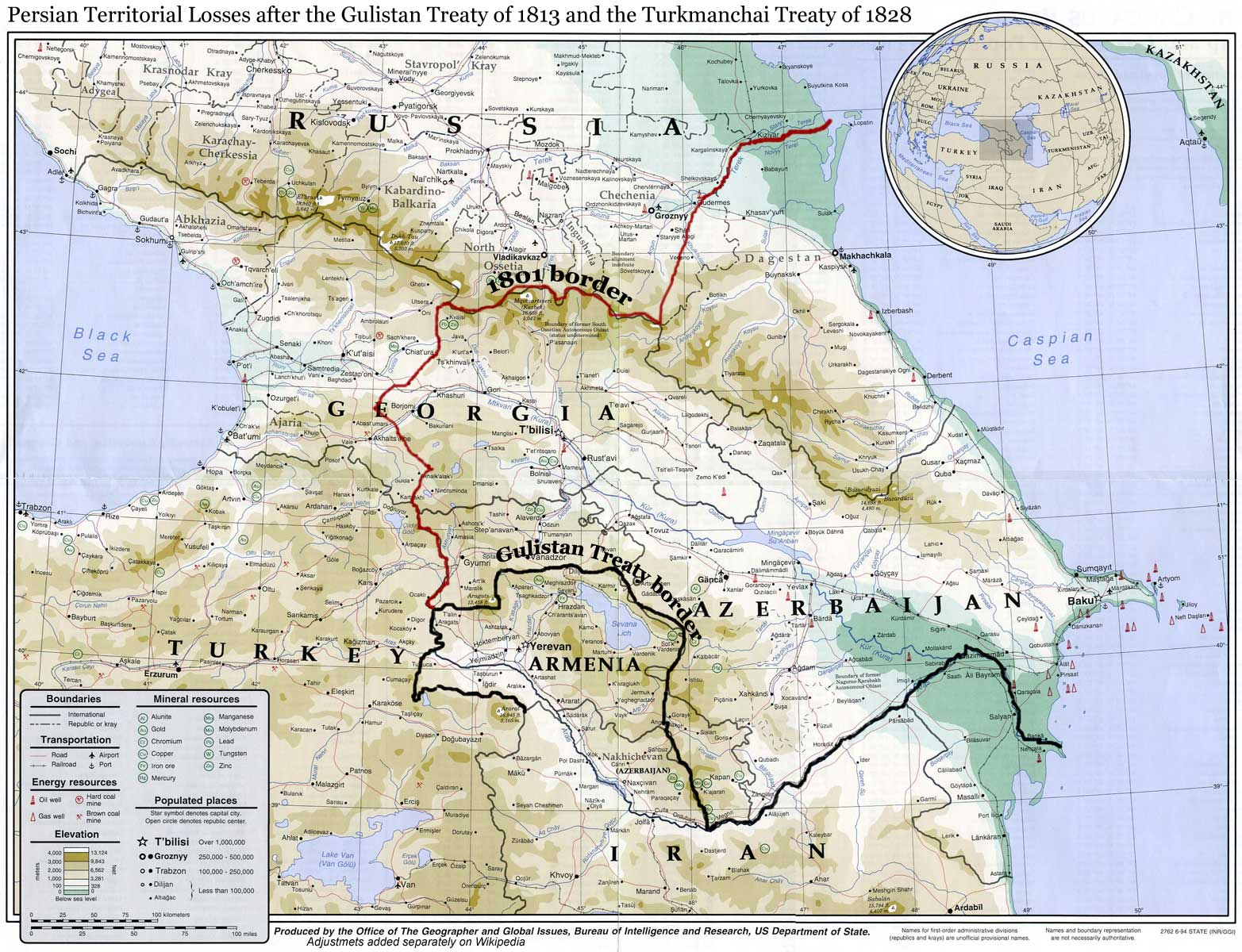
Persian territorial losses to the Russians following the Treaty of Gulistan in 1813 and the Treaty of Turkmenchay in 1828.

Following the signature of the Treaty of Turkmenchay, Persia experienced considerable instability. Alexander Sergeyevich Griboedov, a Russian envoy, was murdered in Tehran in 1829. In 1830, Fath Ali Shah sent a diplomatic mission to Russia to apologise formally.

In 1831, there was unrest in Yazd and Kerman, and in 1832, several chieftains rebelled in Quchan and Turbat-i Haidari in 1832. Following the death of Fath Ali Shah in 1834, there were increased concerns over the possibility of civil war. Rival claimants to the throne stirred up further discontent in the early reign of Mohammed Shah. In 1839 and 1840, Isfahan experienced serious unrest after high-ranking officials questioned and inhibited the central government's authority.

Over the course of the 19th century, Qajar Persia largely fell into the sphere of influence of Russia, who jostled control over Iran and Afghanistan with Britain during the Great Game. The Romanovs shifted to a policy of 'informal support' for the weakened Qajar dynasty — continuing to place pressure with advances in the largely nomadic Turkestan, a crucial frontier territory of the Qajars — this Russian domination of Persia continued for nearly a century. The Persian monarchy became more of a symbolic concept in which Russian diplomats were themselves powerbrokers in Iran and the monarchy was dependent on Russian and British loans for funds. The Russian Empire backed Persian sieges of Herat in 1837–1838 and 1856, as part of the Great Game. For Persia, the expansion into Afghanistan was an attempt to compensate for the lost territories to Russia in the Caucasus.

Russia became concerned with silk production in the Caucasus. Merchants in Elisavetpol (formerly Ganja) expressed interest in assuming control of the Caucasian silk industry. Russian authorities also attempted to reallocate the lands of Azerbaijani nobles among Russian landlords, an action which proved unsuccessful. T.B. Armstrong, a traveller in the region, noted that the new Russian domination of the Caucasus was resented in Zanjan and parts of Azerbaijan.

By 1860, fifty thousand Persians had settled in the Caucasian region. Trade continued between Russia and Persia, consisting of sugar and petroleum exported to Persia, and cotton, rice, wool, dried fruit exported to Russia. In 1897, exports into Russia totalled 18,649,669 rubles, and imports into Persia were 16,036,032 rubles.

In 1879, the establishment of the Cossack Brigade by Russian officers gave the Russian Empire influence over the modernization of the Qajar army. This influence was especially pronounced because the Persian monarchy's legitimacy was predicated on an image of military prowess. By the 1890s, Russian tutors, doctors and officers were prominent at the Shah's court, influencing policy personally. In 1907 the Russian Empire, alongside the British Empire, partitioned Iran into spheres of influence with the Anglo-Russian Convention. Russian forces would also enter Persia during the Russian involvement in the Persian Constitutional Revolution.

== Overview of conflicts ==
No.	Name	Result
1	Russo-Persian War (1651–1653)	Persian victory: Persia destroys the Russian fortress on its side of the Terek River and expels the Russian garrison there.
2	Russo-Persian War (1722–1723)	Russian victory: Russia gains possession of Derbent, Baku, Shirvan, and the modern Persian provinces of Gilan, Mazandaran, and Astarabad, but returns all of these territories to Persia by the Treaty of Resht in 1732 and the Treaty of Ganja in 1735.
3	Persian expedition of 1796	Persian victory: Russian withdrawal. Status quo ante bellum.
4	Russo-Persian War (1804–1813)	Russian victory: Persia cedes Georgia, Dagestan, parts of northern Armenia, and most of modern Azerbaijan to Russia by the Treaty of Gulistan in 1813.
5	Russo-Persian War (1826–1828)	Russian victory: Persia cedes all of Armenia, the Nakhichevan Khanate, and Azerbaijan to Russia by the Treaty of Turkmenchay in 1828.
6	Russian involvement in the Persian Constitutional Revolution (1908–1911)	Russian victory: Russia occupies Tabriz and other parts of northern Persia from 1909 to 1918, defending the Persian loyalists and foreign embassies there by defeating the Persian constitutionalists, thus fulfilling its goal as a great power intervening in the region.

== See also ==
- Russian conquest of the Caucasus
  - Caucasian War
    - Russo-Caucasian conflict
- Russo-Turkish Wars
- Persian campaign (World War I)
- Persian Socialist Soviet Republic
- Anglo-Soviet invasion of Iran
  - Iran crisis of 1946
