= Sohrab Khan Gorji (Iranian commander) =

19th-century Iranian Commander

Sohrab Khan Gorji (born: 1764–1792; died: 1834–1892) was a commander and chief of staff who served the Persian army during the reign of Fath-Ali Shah Qajar. He fought both the Ottoman Empire and the Russian Empire. Sohrab Khan was also the governor of several Iranian cities. He was of Georgian origin.

== Biography ==
Sohrab Khan had fought in the 19th century for the Iranian army under the command of Fath-Ali Shah in the Ottoman-Iranian Wars, Russo-Iranian Wars, and several others. He held the title Gholam-e Pishkhedmat-bashi (chief of staff) and was granted the governorship of Torbat, Barsan (likely Bardaskan), Kadkan, Mahvelat, and Sarjam.

=== Battles ===
In 1822, Sohrab Khan was the commander of a division of the Iranian army in the war against the Ottoman Empire near the city of Van, Turkey.

In 1826, Sohrab Khan was the commander of the Iranian army in the battle of Shamkir for the liberation of Elisavetpol (now, city of Ganja, Azerbaijan; then, a Russian-occupied Persian territory).

In 1827, Sohrab Khan was the commander of the Iranian army in the Russo-Persian war under the command of Abbas-Mirza. The Russian forces were defeated in Yerevan and Nakhjavan. Sohrab Khan was ordered to encircle Etchmiadzin Cathedral (now, in Armenia; then, a Persian territory).

In 1832, Sohrab Khan was the commander of the Iranian army in conquering AmirAbad fort near Chenaran and restoring peace in Sarakhs that was disturbed by a group of thieves and hostage takers from Marv (Mary, Turkmenistan).

In 1834, following the death of Fath-Ali shah, a rivalry broke out between one of his sons and one of his grandsons over the thrown. Sohrab Khan was ordered by one contender to take the artilleries such as cannons and Zamburaks to the battlefield to resolve the matter with show of force against the other one.

=== Governorship ===
In 1832, Sohrab Khan became the governor of the cities of Torbat, Barsan (likely Bardaskan), Kadkan, Mahvelat, and Sarjam.

=== Family ===
Sohrab Khan had one child, Mohammad Reza Khan, who married a daughter of the Crown Prince Abbas-Mirza.

Mohammad Reza Khan died of cholera in 1835. His wife, i.e. the princess, died childless prior to 1845.

=== Children ===
- Mohammad Reza Khan (born: before 1815; died: 1835); married a princess, i.e. Abbas-Mirza's daughter. They died childless.

== Alternate names and titles ==
Sohrab's alternate names include: Zurab, Zorab, Zourab, and Zohrab; (Georgian: ზურაბ); (Persian: (سهراب), (زوراب))

Sohrab Khan's alternate titles include (in Persian):

- سهراب خان (سهرابخان)
- سهراب خان گرجی
- سهراب خان گرجی غلام پیشخدمت
- سهراب خان گرجی غلام پیشخدمت باشی
- سهراب خان گرجی امیر تومان

== Disambiguation ==
Khavari, the historian contemporary to Sohrab Khan, recorded a distinct title for Sohrab Khan, i.e. Gholam-e Pishkhedmat-bashi (غلام پیشخدمت‌باشی, lit. chief of staff). Khavari also narrated the events involving another Sohrab Khan Gorji who had his own distinct title, i.e. tahvildar (تحویلدار, lit. treasurer) and was also contemporary to the historian. They were two different individuals both named Sohrab Khan Gorji but with their own unique titles and fields of work.

However, the 21st-century researcher Kondo, while his main research was about Sohrab, the treasurer, somehow interpreted the Khavari's reference such that they are both the same Sohrab.
