= Pangi, Iran =

Village in Razavi Khorasan province, Iran

Pangi Persian: پنگي
- Village
- Location within Iran
- Coordinates: 35°38′49″N 59°00′01″E
- Country: Iran
- Province: Razavi Khorasan
- County: Torbat-e Heydarieh
- District: Kadkan
- Rural District: Roqicheh

Population (2016)
  - Total: 218
- Time zone: UTC+3:30 (IRST)

Pangi (Persian: پنگي) (Note: Also romanized as Pangī; also known as Panqi) is a village in Roqicheh Rural District of Kadkan District in Torbat-e Heydarieh County, Razavi Khorasan province, Iran.

== Demographics ==
=== Population ===
At the time of the 2006 National Census, the village's population was 233 in 51 households. The following census in 2011 counted 200 people in 63 households. The 2016 census measured the population of the village as 218 people in 65 households.
