= Talkh Bakhsh =

Village in Razavi Khorasan province, Iran

Talkh Bakhsh Persian: تلخ بخش
- Village
- Location within Iran
- Coordinates: 35°43′24″N 58°51′45″E
- Country: Iran
- Province: Razavi Khorasan
- County: Torbat-e Heydarieh
- District: Kadkan
- Rural District: Kadkan

Population (2016)
  - Total: 1,318
- Time zone: UTC+3:30 (IRST)

Talkh Bakhsh (Persian: تلخ بخش) (Note: Also known as Qal‘eh Zavār and Talkheh Bakhsh) is a village in Kadkan Rural District of Kadkan District in Torbat-e Heydarieh County, Razavi Khorasan province, Iran.

== Demographics ==
=== Population ===
At the time of the 2006 National Census, the village's population was 1,108 in 248 households. The following census in 2011 counted 1,157 people in 328 households. The 2016 census measured the population of the village as 1,318 people in 379 households.
