= Deh Menar =

Village in Razavi Khorasan province, Iran

Deh Menar Persian: ده منار
- Village
- Location within Iran
- Coordinates: 35°36′26″N 59°03′40″E
- Country: Iran
- Province: Razavi Khorasan
- County: Torbat-e Heydarieh
- District: Kadkan
- Rural District: Roqicheh

Population (2016)
  - Total: 62
- Time zone: UTC+3:30 (IRST)

Deh Menar (Persian: ده منار) (Note: Also romanized as Deh Menār) is a village in Roqicheh Rural District of Kadkan District in Torbat-e Heydarieh County, Razavi Khorasan province, Iran.

== Demographics ==
=== Population ===
At the time of the 2006 National Census, the village's population was 51 in 14 households. The following census in 2011 counted 60 people in 17 households. The 2016 census measured the population of the village as 62 people in 20 households.
