= Nowzheh =

Village in Razavi Khorasan province, Iran

Nowzheh Persian: نوژه
- Village
- Location within Iran
- Coordinates: 35°44′11″N 59°01′42″E
- Country: Iran
- Province: Razavi Khorasan
- County: Torbat-e Heydarieh
- District: Kadkan
- Rural District: Roqicheh

Population (2016)
  - Total: 170
- Time zone: UTC+3:30 (IRST)

Nowzheh (Persian: نوژه) (Note: Also known as Now Deh (نوده) and Nowzeh) is a village in Roqicheh Rural District of Kadkan District in Torbat-e Heydarieh County, Razavi Khorasan province, Iran.

== Demographics ==
=== Population ===
At the time of the 2006 National Census, the village's population was 191 in 50 households. The following census in 2011 counted 129 people in 42 households. The 2016 census measured the population of the village as 170 people in 59 households.
