= Taraqqi =

Taraqqi may refer to:

- Goli Taraqqi, Iranian writer
- Taraqqi, Iran, a village in Razavi Khorasan Province, Iran
