= Esfiz =

Village in Razavi Khorasan province, Iran

Esfiz Persian: اسفيز
- Village
- Location within Iran
- Coordinates: 35°34′43″N 58°48′36″E
- Country: Iran
- Province: Razavi Khorasan
- County: Torbat-e Heydarieh
- District: Kadkan
- Rural District: Kadkan

Population (2016)
  - Total: 967
- Time zone: UTC+3:30 (IRST)

Esfiz (Persian: اسفيز) (Note: Also romanized as Esfīz; also known as Kalāteh-ye Esfīz) is a village in Kadkan Rural District of Kadkan District in Torbat-e Heydarieh County, Razavi Khorasan province, Iran.

== Demographics ==
=== Population ===
At the time of the 2006 National Census, the village's population was 786 in 185 households. The following census in 2011 counted 816 people in 236 households. The 2016 census measured the population of the village as 967 people in 273 households.
