= Burs =

Burs may refer to:

- Bürs, Austria
- Burs, Iran
- Burs (Dacia), a Dacian tribe
- In older literature the name of Birs or Birs Nimrud, see the archaeological site of Borsippa in modern-day Iraq
- Burs, Gotland on Gotland, Sweden
