= Davariyeh =

Village in Razavi Khorasan province, Iran

Davariyeh Persian: داوريه
- Village
- Location within Iran
- Coordinates: 35°44′26″N 59°04′20″E
- Country: Iran
- Province: Razavi Khorasan
- County: Torbat-e Heydarieh
- District: Kadkan
- Rural District: Roqicheh

Population (2016)
  - Total: 127
- Time zone: UTC+3:30 (IRST)

Davariyeh (Persian: داوريه) (Note: Also romanized as Dāvarīyeh; also known as Gonbeyeh Kan) is a village in Roqicheh Rural District of Kadkan District in Torbat-e Heydarieh County, Razavi Khorasan province, Iran.

== Demographics ==
=== Population ===
At the time of the 2006 National Census, the village's population was 193 in 37 households. The following census in 2011 counted 154 people in 40 households. The 2016 census measured the population of the village as 127 people in 32 households.
