= Nosratabad, Torbat-e Heydarieh =

Village in Razavi Khorasan province, Iran

Nosratabad Persian: نصرت اباد
- Village
- Location within Iran
- Coordinates: 35°38′10″N 59°02′13″E
- Country: Iran
- Province: Razavi Khorasan
- County: Torbat-e Heydarieh
- District: Kadkan
- Rural District: Roqicheh

Population (2016)
  - Total: 475
- Time zone: UTC+3:30 (IRST)

Nosratabad (Persian: نصرت اباد) (Note: Also romanized as Noşratābād; also known as Noratābād) is a village in Roqicheh Rural District of Kadkan District in Torbat-e Heydarieh County, Razavi Khorasan province, Iran.

== Demographics ==
=== Population ===
At the time of the 2006 National Census, the village's population was 538 in 118 households. The following census in 2011 counted 448 people in 125 households. The 2016 census measured the population of the village as 475 people in 137 households, the most populous in its rural district.
