= Chulanak-e Sofla =

Village in Razavi Khorasan province, Iran

Chulanak-e Sofla Persian: چولانك سفلي
- Village
- Location within Iran
- Coordinates: 35°43′34″N 58°58′37″E
- Country: Iran
- Province: Razavi Khorasan
- County: Torbat-e Heydarieh
- District: Kadkan
- Rural District: Roqicheh

Population (2016)
  - Total: 150
- Time zone: UTC+3:30 (IRST)

Chulanak-e Sofla (Persian: چولانك سفلي) (Note: Also romanized as Chūlānak-e Soflá; also known as Chūlānak-e Pā’īn, Chūlūnak-e Pā’īn, and Jelūnak-e Pā’īn) is a village in Roqicheh Rural District of Kadkan District in Torbat-e Heydarieh County, Razavi Khorasan province, Iran.

== Demographics ==
=== Population ===
At the time of the 2006 National Census, the village's population was 153 in 38 households. The following census in 2011 counted 140 people in 44 households. The 2016 census measured the population of the village as 150 people in 48 households.
