= Abdabad, Razavi Khorasan =

Village in Razavi Khorasan province, Iran

Abdabad Persian: عبداباد
- Village
- Location within Iran
- Coordinates: 35°35′50″N 59°03′43″E
- Country: Iran
- Province: Razavi Khorasan
- County: Torbat-e Heydarieh
- District: Kadkan
- Rural District: Roqicheh

Population (2016)
  - Total: 288
- Time zone: UTC+3:30 (IRST)

Abdabad (Persian: عبداباد) (Note: Also romanized as ‘Abdābād; also known as Abdol Ābād) is a village in Roqicheh Rural District of Kadkan District in Torbat-e Heydarieh County, Razavi Khorasan province, Iran.

== Demographics ==
=== Population ===
At the time of the 2006 National Census, the village's population was 366 in 101 households. The following census in 2011 counted 327 people in 103 households. The 2016 census measured the population of the village as 288 people in 95 households.
