= Kateh Talkh =

Village in Razavi Khorasan province, Iran

Kateh Talkh Persian: كته تلخ
- Village
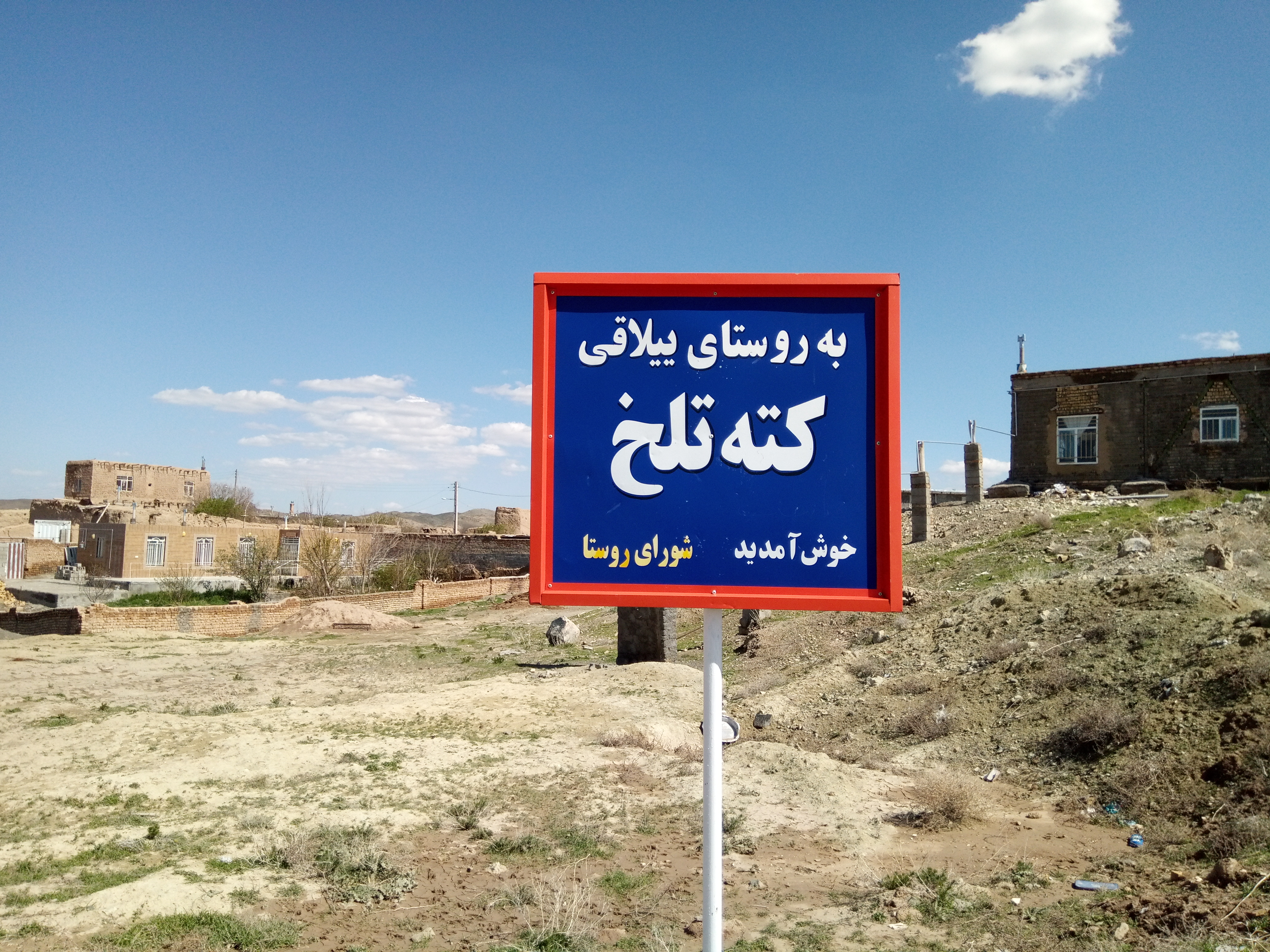
- Entrance sign to the village of Kateh Talkh

- Location within Iran
- Coordinates: 35°43′05″N 59°02′02″E
- Country: Iran
- Province: Razavi Khorasan
- County: Torbat-e Heydarieh
- District: Kadkan
- Rural District: Roqicheh

Population (2016)
  - Total: 106
- Time zone: UTC+3:30 (IRST)

Kateh Talkh (Persian: كته تلخ) is a village in Roqicheh Rural District of Kadkan District in Torbat-e Heydarieh County, Razavi Khorasan province, Iran.

== Demographics ==
=== Population ===
At the time of the 2006 National Census, the village's population was 108 in 36 households. The following census in 2011 counted 97 people in 36 households. The 2016 census measured the population of the village as 106 people in 36 households.
