= Hesar-e Yazdan =

Village in Razavi Khorasan province, Iran

Hesar-e Yazdan Persian: حصاريزدان
- Village
- Location within Iran
- Coordinates: 35°45′40″N 59°01′53″E
- Country: Iran
- Province: Razavi Khorasan
- County: Torbat-e Heydarieh
- District: Kadkan
- Rural District: Roqicheh

Population (2016)
  - Total: 389
- Time zone: UTC+3:30 (IRST)

Hesar-e Yazdan (Persian: حصاريزدان) (Note: Also romanized as Ḩeşār Yazdān and Ḩeşār-e Yazdān) is a village in Roqicheh Rural District of Kadkan District in Torbat-e Heydarieh County, Razavi Khorasan province, Iran.

== Demographics ==
=== Population ===
At the time of the 2006 National Census, the village's population was 457 in 121 households. The following census in 2011 counted 393 people in 114 households. The 2016 census measured the population of the village as 389 people in 116 households.
