= Roqicheh =

Village in Razavi Khorasan province, Iran

Roqicheh Persian: رقيچه
- Village
- Location within Iran
- Coordinates: 35°35′55″N 59°02′38″E
- Country: Iran
- Province: Razavi Khorasan
- County: Torbat-e Heydarieh
- District: Kadkan
- Rural District: Roqicheh

Population (2016)
  - Total: 334
- Time zone: UTC+3:30 (IRST)

Roqicheh (Persian: رقيچه) (Note: Also romanized as Roqeycheh, Raqīcheh, and Roqīcheh; also known as Aghicha, Aqīcheh, and Raghicheh) is a village in, and the capital of, Roqicheh Rural District in Kadkan District of Torbat-e Heydarieh County, Razavi Khorasan province, Iran.

== Demographics ==
=== Population ===
At the time of the 2006 National Census, the village's population was 360 in 97 households. The following census in 2011 counted 287 people in 95 households. The 2016 census measured the population of the village as 334 people in 106 households.
