= Chang Kalagh =

Village in Razavi Khorasan province, Iran

Chang Kalagh Persian: چنگ كلاغ
- Village
- Location within Iran
- Coordinates: 35°42′34″N 59°04′32″E
- Country: Iran
- Province: Razavi Khorasan
- County: Torbat-e Heydarieh
- District: Kadkan
- Rural District: Roqicheh

Population (2016)
  - Total: 150
- Time zone: UTC+3:30 (IRST)

Chang Kalagh (Persian: چنگ كلاغ) (Note: Also romanized as Chang Kalāgh; also known as Chīng Kalāgh (چينگ كلاغ)) is a village in Roqicheh Rural District of Kadkan District in Torbat-e Heydarieh County, Razavi Khorasan province, Iran.

== Demographics ==
=== Population ===
At the time of the 2006 National Census, the village's population was 201 in 44 households. The following census in 2011 counted 186 people in 48 households. The 2016 census measured the population of the village as 150 people in 43 households.
