= Dafi =

Village in Razavi Khorasan province, Iran

Dafi Persian: دافي
- Village
- Location within Iran
- Coordinates: 35°35′41″N 58°45′49″E
- Country: Iran
- Province: Razavi Khorasan
- County: Torbat-e Heydarieh
- District: Kadkan
- Rural District: Kadkan

Population (2016)
  - Total: 2,251
- Time zone: UTC+3:30 (IRST)

Dafi (Persian: دافي) (Note: Also romanized as Dāfī; also known as Lākhī) is a village in Kadkan Rural District of Kadkan District in Torbat-e Heydarieh County, Razavi Khorasan province, Iran.

== Demographics ==
=== Population ===
At the time of the 2006 National Census, the village's population was 1,845 in 390 households. The following census in 2011 counted 1,918 people in 545 households. The 2016 census measured the population of the village as 2,251 people in 653 households, the most populous in its rural district.
