= Hajji Beygi =

Village in Razavi Khorasan province, Iran

Hajji Beygi Persian: حاجي بيگي
- Village
- Location within Iran
- Coordinates: 35°32′29″N 59°02′38″E
- Country: Iran
- Province: Razavi Khorasan
- County: Torbat-e Heydarieh
- District: Kadkan
- Rural District: Roqicheh

Population (2016)
  - Total: 366
- Time zone: UTC+3:30 (IRST)

Hajji Beygi (Persian: حاجي بيگي) (Note: Also romanized as Ḩājjī Beygī) is a village in Roqicheh Rural District of Kadkan District in Torbat-e Heydarieh County, Razavi Khorasan province, Iran.

== Demographics ==
=== Population ===
At the time of the 2006 National Census, the village's population was 359 in 106 households. The following census in 2011 counted 365 people in 117 households. The 2016 census measured the population of the village as 366 people in 129 households.
