= Tarqi, Razavi Khorasan =

Village in Razavi Khorasan province, Iran

Tarqi Persian: ترقي
- Village
- Location within Iran
- Coordinates: 35°39′17″N 58°58′10″E
- Country: Iran
- Province: Razavi Khorasan
- County: Torbat-e Heydarieh
- District: Kadkan
- Rural District: Roqicheh

Population (2016)
  - Total: 304
- Time zone: UTC+3:30 (IRST)

Tarqi (Persian: ترقي) (Note: Also romanized as Tarqī; also known as Taraghghi, Taraqqī, Targbi, and Targhī) is a village in Roqicheh Rural District of Kadkan District in Torbat-e Heydarieh County, Razavi Khorasan province, Iran.

== Demographics ==
=== Population ===
At the time of the 2006 National Census, the village's population was 372 in 84 households. The following census in 2011 counted 310 people in 95 households. The 2016 census measured the population of the village as 304 people in 98 households.
