= Treaty of Constantinople (1724) =

1724 Russian-Ottoman peace treaty

- Type: Peace
- Context: Partition of the territories of Safavid Iran; Russo-Ottoman geopolitical competition
- Signed: 12 June 1724
- Location: Constantinople
- Mediators: France
- Parties: Ottoman Empire; Russian Empire

The Treaty of Constantinople (Russian: Константинопольский договор,) Russo-Ottoman Treaty or Treaty of the Partition of Persia (Iran Mukasemenamesi) was a treaty concluded on 24 June 1724 between the Ottoman Empire and the Russian Empire, dividing large portions of the territory of mutually neighbouring Safavid Iran between them.

== Background ==
The Russians and the Ottomans were engaged in a race to occupy more Iranian territories and were about to engage in a war over the occupation of Gandjeh when France intervened. In the Russo-Persian War (1722–1723), Russia had managed to conquer swaths of Safavid Iran's territories in the North Caucasus, Transcaucasia, and northern mainland Iran, while the Ottoman Turks had invaded and conquered all Iranian territories in the west, most notably Georgia and Armenia. Still, the news of a Russo-Iranian accord that would settle the 1722–1723 Russo-Iranian War precipitated a crisis between Imperial Russia and Ottoman Empire, who openly stated that it would not permit any other power to establish itself on the Caspian Sea.

== Terms ==
As the Ottomans and Russians both neighboured each other as well as Iran for centuries, and all three were geo-political rivals of each other, the matter was taken into the highest regard. With France as intermediary, the two governments of the Ottoman Empire and Russia eventually signed a treaty in Constantinople on 12 June 1724, dividing a large portion of Iran between them. Thus, the annexed Iranian lands located on the east of the conjunction of the rivers Kurosh (Kur) and Aras were given to the Russians. These comprised the provinces in northern mainland Iran (Gilan, Mazandaran and Astrabad), the territories in Dagestan (amongst which Derbent), as well as Baku and the territory surrounding it in the Shirvan province. The lands on the west went to the Ottomans, comprising large parts of Iranian Azerbaijan (incl. Ardabil and Tabriz), Hamadan, Kermanshah, and much of the rest of Iranian-ruled Transcaucasia (encompassing modern-day Georgia and Armenia).

The treaty furthermore specified that if Safavid Iran, ruled by Shah Tahmasp II, would refuse to accept the treaty, both Imperial Russia and the Porte would take common action against Iran and install a puppet ruler.

However, the gains for both Russia and Ottoman Empire proved to be very brief, for the 1732 Treaty of Resht and 1735 Treaty of Ganja returned all territories taken by Russia back to Iran, while the Ottoman–Persian War (1730–35) decisively returned all Ottoman annexed territories back to Iran.

== See also ==
- Treaty of Saint Petersburg (1723)
- Treaty of Resht
- Treaty of Ganja
