= Kadkan Rural District =

Rural district in Razavi Khorasan province, Iran

Kadkan Rural District Persian: دهستان كدكن
- Rural District
- Location within Iran
- Coordinates: 35°37′N 58°52′E
- Country: Iran
- Province: Razavi Khorasan
- County: Torbat-e Heydarieh
- District: Kadkan
- Established: 1987
- Capital: Kadkan

Population (2016)
  - Total: 5,941
- Time zone: UTC+3:30 (IRST)

Kadkan Rural District (Persian: دهستان كدكن) is in Kadkan District of Torbat-e Heydarieh County, Razavi Khorasan province, Iran. It is administered from the city of Kadkan.

== Demographics ==
=== Population ===
At the time of the 2006 National Census, the rural district's population was 5,107 in 1,204 households. There were 5,147 inhabitants in 1,528 households at the following census of 2011. The 2016 census measured the population of the rural district as 5,941 in 1,783 households. The most populous of its 34 villages was Dafi, with 2,251 people.

=== Other villages in the rural district ===
- Bors
- Esfiz
- Talkh Bakhsh
