= Roqicheh Rural District =

Rural district in Razavi Khorasan province, Iran

Roqicheh Rural District Persian: دهستان رقيچه
- Rural District
- Location within Iran
- Coordinates: 35°41′N 59°02′E
- Country: Iran
- Province: Razavi Khorasan
- County: Torbat-e Heydarieh
- District: Kadkan
- Established: 1996
- Capital: Roqicheh

Population (2016)
  - Total: 3,145
- Time zone: UTC+3:30 (IRST)

Roqicheh Rural District (Persian: دهستان رقيچه) is in Kadkan District of Torbat-e Heydarieh County, Razavi Khorasan province, Iran. Its capital is the village of Roqicheh.

== Demographics ==
=== Population ===
At the time of the 2006 National Census, the rural district's population was 3,582 in 897 households. There were 3,096 inhabitants in 939 households at the following census of 2011. The 2016 census measured the population of the rural district as 3,145 in 985 households. The most populous of its 52 villages was Nosratabad, with 475 people.

=== Other villages in the rural district ===
- Abdabad
- Chang Kalagh
- Chulanak-e Sofla
- Davariyeh
- Deh Menar
- Hajji Beygi
- Hesar-e Yazdan
- Kateh Talkh
- Nowzheh
- Pangi
- Tarqi
