= Bors, Iran =

Village in Razavi Khorasan province, Iran

Bors Persian: برس
- Village
- Location within Iran
- Coordinates: 35°35′18″N 58°57′12″E
- Country: Iran
- Province: Razavi Khorasan
- County: Torbat-e Heydarieh
- District: Kadkan
- Rural District: Kadkan

Population (2016)
  - Total: 1,405
- Time zone: UTC+3:30 (IRST)

Bors (Persian: برس) (Note: Also known as Burs) is a village in Kadkan Rural District of Kadkan District in Torbat-e Heydarieh County, Razavi Khorasan province, Iran.

== Demographics ==
=== Population ===
At the time of the 2006 National Census, the village's population was 1,366 in 379 households. The following census in 2011 counted 1,256 people in 419 households. The 2016 census measured the population of the village as 1,405 people in 478 households.
