= Kadkan =

City in Razavi Khorasan province, Iran

Kadkan Persian: كدكن
- City
- Location within Iran
- Coordinates: 35°35′06″N 58°52′41″E
- Country: Iran
- Province: Razavi Khorasan
- County: Torbat-e Heydarieh
- District: Kadkan
- Established as a city: 1996

Population (2016)
  - Total: 3,719
- Time zone: UTC+3:30 (IRST)

Kadkan (Persian: كدكن) (Note: Also known as Katkan) is a city in, and the capital of, Kadkan District in Torbat-e Heydarieh County, Razavi Khorasan province, Iran. It also serves as the administrative center for Kadkan Rural District. The village of Kadkan was converted to a city in 1996.

== Demographics ==
=== Population ===
At the time of the 2006 National Census, the city's population was 3,166 in 840 households. The following census in 2011 counted 3,788 people in 1,016 households. The 2016 census measured the population of the city as 3,719 people in 1,164 households.
