= Treaty of Saint Petersburg (1723) =

Peace treaty which ended the Russo-Persian War of 1722–1723

The Treaty of Saint Petersburg of 23 September [O.S. 12 September] 1723 concluded the Russo-Persian War of 1722–1723 between the Russian Empire and Safavid Iran. It ratified Iran's forced ceding of its territories in the North Caucasus, South Caucasus, and contemporary mainland Northern Iran, comprising Derbent (Dagestan), Baku, the respective surrounding lands of Shirvan, as well as the provinces of Gilan, Mazandaran, and Astarabad. The treaty further specified that the Iranian shah would receive Russian troops for domestic peacekeeping.

As the Cambridge History of Iran states;

"On 23 September 1723, his ambassador in Saint Petersburg, Ismail Beg, signed a humiliating treaty which stipulated that the Tsar would accord the shah friendship and help against rebels and would maintain the shah in tranquil possession of his throne. In return the shah promised to permanently cede to Russia: ... the towns of Darband (Derbent), Baku, with all the territories belonging to them, as well as the provinces: Gilan, Mazandaran, and Astarabad, so that they might support the forces which His Imperial Majesty [the Tsar] will send to help His Shahian Majesty against rebels, without demanding money for it."

The signatory on the Safavid side was the envoy Ismail Beg, who had been sent by Shah Tahmasp II himself. When the text of the treaty was brought to the temporary capital of Qazvin in April 1724 by Prince Boris Meshcherskii (a sub-lieutenant of the Preobrazhensky Guard regiment), the population was well aware of Russia's actions. Unruly mobs received Meshcherskii and his entourage with violent threats. He was received with customary ceremoniousness by Tahmasp II, but the latter refused to ratify the treaty. This decision was made as it was clear that the Russians, though having occupied the Iranian territories, were too small to pose a major threat to Iran, even though the latter had been seriously weakened through the frantic events of the early 1720s. Furthermore, Tahmasp II knew that they were incapable of aiding him in expelling the Afghan rebels. There's also a possibility that Tahmasp II was aware of Russia's secret negotiations with the Ottoman Empire (see Treaty of Constantinople (1724)). Ismail Beg was forced to flee punishment upon return, and died in exile in Astrakhan some twenty years later.

All conquered and gained territories were returned to Iran which now led by the emerging Nader Qoli Beg (later known as Nader Shah) in 1732 and 1735 respectively, under the terms of the Treaty of Resht and Treaty of Ganja, during the reign of Empress Anna Ioannovna.

== See also ==
- Treaty of Constantinople (1724)
- Treaty of Resht
- Treaty of Ganja
