= Treaty of Ganja =

Treaty between Russia and Iran

The Treaty of Ganja was concluded between the Russian Empire and Safavids on 10 March 1735 during the Persian Siege of Ganja (1734) near the city of Ganja in present-day Azerbaijan. The treaty established a defensive alliance against the Ottoman Empire, which had suffered a defeat in the Ottoman–Persian War (1730–1735). The Russian government agreed to return the remaining Persian territories in the North Caucasus and South Caucasus, including Derbend and Baku, that had been conquered by Peter the Great during the Russo-Persian War (1722–1723). The treaty also confirmed the provisions of the 1732 Treaty of Resht whereby Russia renounced its claim to Gilan, Mazandaran, and Astrabad, and Safavid state recognized Vakhtang VI, a pro-Russian Georgian king-in-exile. The treaty provided for Russia a diplomatic advantage in a simmering war with the Ottomans and for the Safavid ruler Nader Shah respite on the western frontier of his empire.

== See also ==
- Treaty of Saint Petersburg (1723)
