= Treaty of Resht =

1732 territorial settlement between the Russian Empire and Safavid Iran

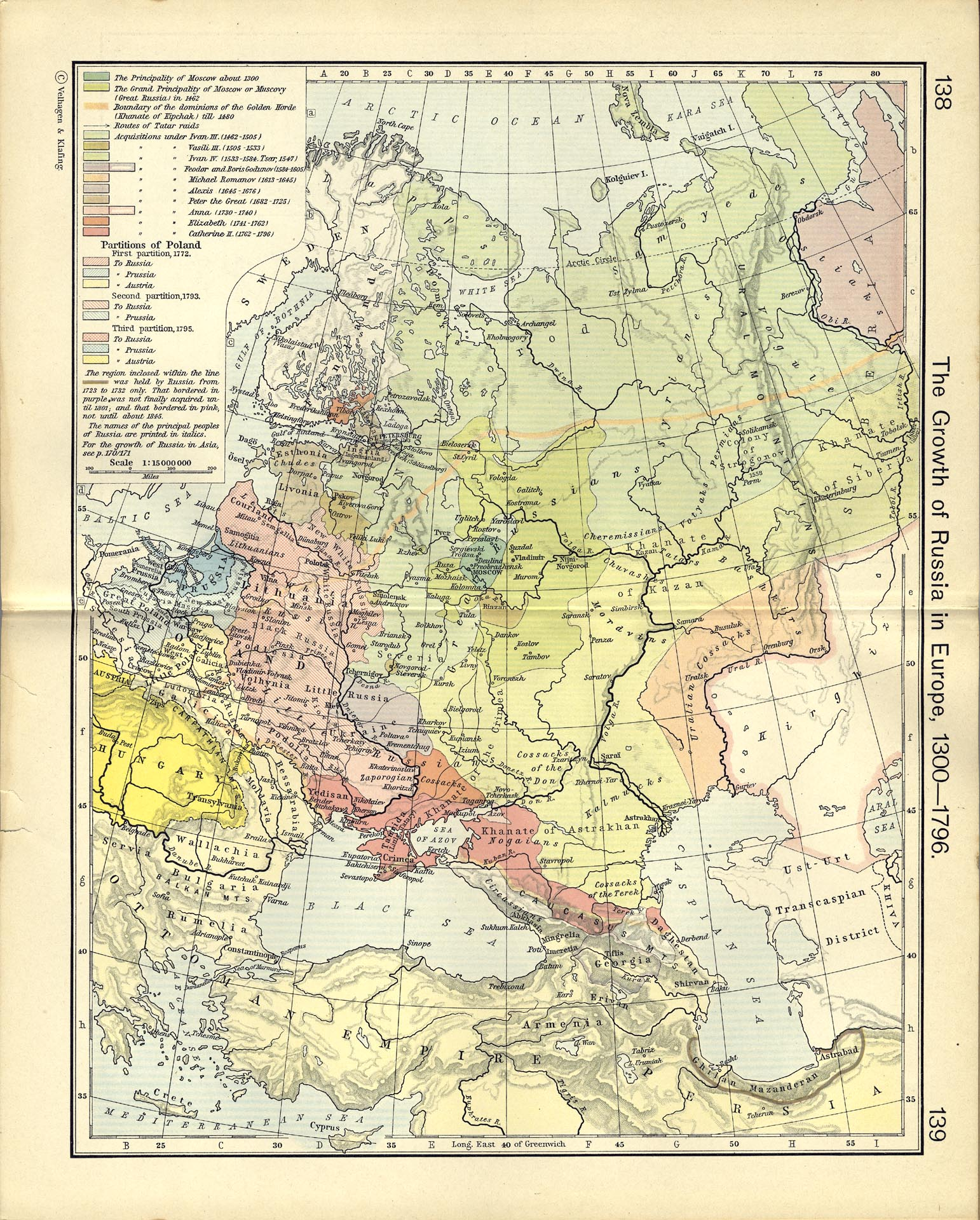
Growth of Russia in Europe, 1300–1796.

The Treaty of Resht was signed between the Russian Empire and Safavid Empire in Rasht on 21 January 1732. According to this treaty Russia waived its claim to any territory south of the Kura River. This included return of the provinces of Gilan, Mazandaran, and Astarabad, conquered by Peter I in the early 1720s. The Iranian cities of Derbent, Tarki, Ganja, etc. north of the Kura river would be returned three years later. In return, the Iranians, now de facto ruled by the militarily successful Nader, granted trade privileges to Russian merchants and promised to restore the Georgian king Vakhtang VI, then residing in exile in Russia, on the throne of Kartli as soon as the Ottoman troops could be expelled from that country. The provisions were confirmed by the 1735 Treaty of Ganja, according which treaty all the regions north of the Kura river were returned as well.

== See also ==
- Treaty of Saint Petersburg (1723)
