= Kadkan District =

District in Razavi Khorasan province, Iran

Kadkan District Persian: بخش کدکن
- District
- Location within Iran
- Coordinates: 35°40′N 58°54′E
- Country: Iran
- Province: Razavi Khorasan
- County: Torbat-e Heydarieh
- Capital: Kadkan

Population (2016)
  - Total: 12,805
- Time zone: UTC+3:30 (IRST)

Kadkan District (Persian: بخش کدکن) is in Torbat-e Heydarieh County, Razavi Khorasan province, Iran. Its capital is the city of Kadkan.

== Demographics ==
=== Population ===
At the time of the 2006 National Census, the district's population was 11,855 in 2,941 households. The following census in 2011 counted 12,031 people in 3,483 households. The 2016 census measured the population of the district as 12,805 inhabitants in 3,932 households.

=== Administrative divisions ===
Kadkan District Population
Administrative Divisions	2006	2011	2016
Kadkan RD	5,107	5,147	5,941
Roqicheh RD	3,582	3,096	3,145
Kadkan (city)	3,166	3,788	3,719
Total	11,855	12,031	12,805
RD = Rural District
