= Restoration of Tahmasp II to the Safavid throne =

- Part of Naderian Wars
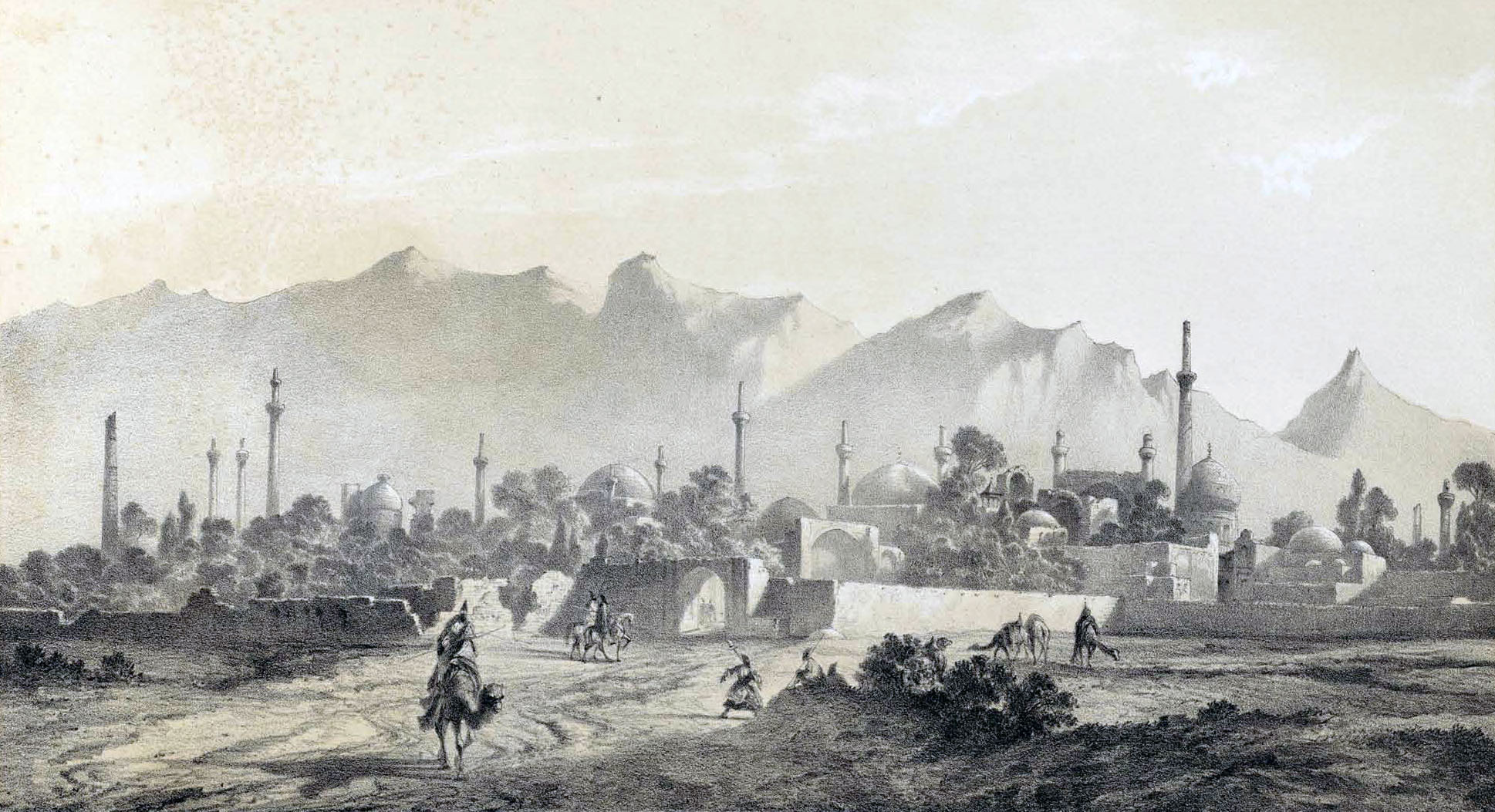
- Isfahan (here depicted from the north-to-south direction), as the capital of Persia, was the ultimate objective of Nader's campaign for the liberation of Persia from Hotaki rule
Date	August 1729 – March 1730
Location	Persia
Result	Safavid victory; Tahmasp II is restored to the throne by Nader Shah

Belligerents
Safavid loyalists	Hotak dynasty Supported by: Ottoman Empire

Commanders and leaders
Nader	Ashraf Hotaki

Strength
20,000–30,000	40,000

Casualties and losses
Minimal	Heavy

The restoration of Tahmasp II to the Safavid throne took place in the latter part of 1729 by a series of battles fought between Nader, Tahmasp's commander-in-chief and Ashraf Hotaki. Despite nominally bringing Tahmasp to the seat of power, true authority still rested with Nader who had ever since the debacle in northern Khorasan managed to seize Tahmasp II as his vassal. Hotak was defeated. As for Afghan rule, the Ghilzai Afghans were ejected from the Iranian Plateau permanently and in the following years were re-annexed by Nader whence they were once again absorbed into the Persian empire. The Safavids under Tahmasp II were restored.

== Overview of the campaign ==
=== Battle of Mihmandoost ===
Having delayed a confrontation with Tahmasp long enough, Ashraf found himself threatened by the pretender to the Safavid throne and his young general Nader. Hearing of their expedition against the Abdali of Herat Ashraf decided to march on the capital of Khorasan and capture Mashad before Nader could return from the east. However, Nader was back in Mashad well before Ashraf had a chance of invading Khorasan. Marching toward Damghan, Nader and Ashraf clashed near the village of Mihmandoost where despite being heavily outnumbered the Persians gave the Afghans a terribly bloody lesson in modern warfare and crushed Ashraf's army forcing him to retire towards Semnan.

=== Ambush at Khwar pass ===
Ashraf retreated west where he set up a well thought out ambush in the Khwar pass where he hoped the Persians, flushed with their recent triumph, would be surprised and dealt a heavy blow. Nader upon discovering the ambush encircled and then completely destroyed it with whatever remnants fleeing towards Isfahan.

=== Battle of Murche-Khort ===
Requesting urgent support from the Ottoman Empire, Ashraf sought to counter the Persian army's thrust towards Isfahan. The Ottomans keen to hold Ashraf in power instead of seeing a resurgent Persia on their eastern frontier were all too eager to help with both guns and artillerymen. At the Battle of Murche-Khort, the Afghans were yet again decisively defeated forcing Ashraf to flee south.

=== Liberation of Isfahan ===
Nader liberated Isfahan and soon after received Tahmasp II outside the main city gates where the Shah expressed his gratitude to Nader. The city had been devastated by the Afghans leaving very little in terms of riches for when Nader arrived. Tahmasp famously wept when he saw what had befallen the capital. The city was greatly reduced both in terms of population and in terms of wealth. The people took vengeance on those Afghans who were found hiding throughout the city.

=== End of Afghan rule in Persia ===
Nader set out from Isfahan heading toward Shiraz where Ashraf was busy raking together what he could with the support of some of the local Arab tribes. At this juncture, there was no realistic hope for a revival of Afghan fortunes. Near Zarghan, the Persians engaged and decimated the last army Ashraf commanded, with historical sources disagreeing on his exact fate in the aftermath of the battle.

== See also ==
- Battle of Damghan (1729)
- Battle of Khwar Pass
- Battle of Murche-Khort
- Battle of Zarghan
