= Peter the Great's capture of Rasht =

1722 siege

- Part of the Russo-Persian War (1722–1723)
Date	December 1722 – 28 March 1723
Location	Rasht
Result	Russian victory
Territorial changes	Russians gain hold of the Caspian town of Rasht for about ten years

Belligerents
(Russia) Russian Empire	Safavid Empire

Commanders and leaders
(Russia) Peter the Great (Russia) Colonel Shipov (Russia) F.I. Soimonov	Tahmasp II

Strength
Two battalions of regular troops. Caspian Flotilla	15,000 untrained and inadequately armed troops, levied mostly from peasantry.

Casualties and losses
Unknown	About or over 1,000

Peter the Great's capture of Rasht (also spelled Resht), occurred between December 1722 and late March 1723 amidst the successful spree of campaigns of Peter the Great during the Russo-Persian War (1722-1723). The capture of Rasht brought the Caspian Sea town alongside the rest of Gilan into Russian possession for a decade, until the Treaty of Resht of 1732, when they would be returned.

== Capture and battle ==
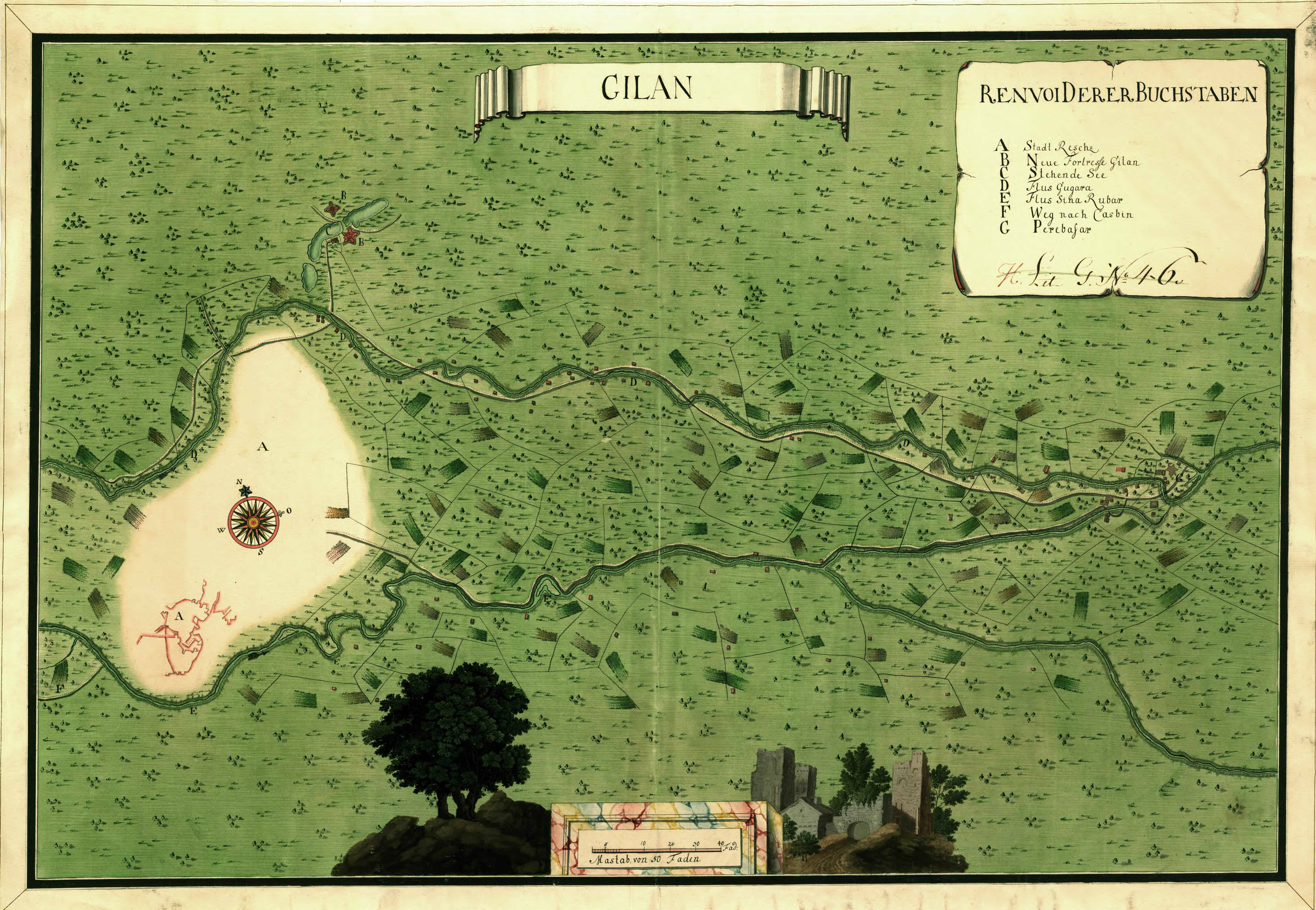
Map of Rasht, likely drawn during its Russian occupation 1722–1735.

The pretext for the Russian conquest was grounded in the same reasons as for why the entire war in general had started; Lezgian tribesmen, nominal subjects of the Safavid crown but at the time in a state of constant revolt against the central government, had made serious devastations in 1721 to the "life and property" of the Russian merchants in the Shirvan province. Furthermore, by 1722, the Safavid Empire was in a heavy decline and found itself in a state of complete turmoil in general, and thus the Safavid governor of the Gilan province had urgently requested Russian aid.

The war went on swiftly for Peter and his troops. By now, he was in possession of Iranian-ruled Dagestan and had made large inroads into Arran and Shirvan, the latter two territories roughly comprising the modern-day Azerbaijan Republic. Taking further advantage of Tahmasp II's desperate situation, Peter wanted to push deeper into Iran and annex even more territories. Even though the bulk of the army had withdrawn to Astrakhan following the storm of early September 1722 that had destroyed a large number of vessels, the horse epidemic that virtually destroyed the Russian cavalry, and the diseases amongst the soldiers which made the Russians suffer tens of thousands of losses every year during the war, he still ordered for new captures, namely the Caspian Sea provinces of contemporary northern Iran and the rest of modern-day Azerbaijan.

In November 1722, he ordered Colonel Shipov to sail for Gilan with two battalion of troops. The vessels of the Caspian Flotilla were under the command of Soimonov. When it was questioned whether two battalions would be sufficient, Peter replied, as quoted by Laurence Lockhart, in characteristic fashion "Why not? Was not Stenka Razin able to maintain himself there with 500 Cossacks? And you have two battalions of regular soldiers and you have doubts!"

Although Peter's forces had entered the town already in late 1722, ostensibly to help defend the city, the local Iranian governor had demanded their withdrawal. In February 1723 the governor is known to have assured the Russians that their help was not needed, the Persians being able to protect themselves, and that Russian troops should leave. Met unwelcomly by both the governor as well as the locals, the Russians were settled in the confines of Rasht in a caravanserai. Around the same time, king Tahmasp II now demanded the immediate withdrawal of the Russians. The Russian commander, Colonel Shipov, promised to send away his artillery and equipment first and then to withdraw. However, he failed to keep his promise and thus found himself under siege in the barracks, near Rasht where the battle commenced. The Safavid governor had mobilized some 15,000 untrained and inadequately armed troops, levied mostly from the peasantry. Late at night on 28 March 1723, a detachment of Russian troops crept through the Persian lines. The Russians attacked from two directions, taking the Iranians by surprise. As the Persians fled, the Russians pursued, killing about, or over, 1,000 men.

== Aftermath ==
By now, Rasht was in firm hands of the Russians. Following the Safavid defeat, Peter now sent four battalions of regular troops under Brigadier Levashev to replace Shipov. Following his arrival in Gilan in September 1723, he decisively dealt with the (remaining) opposition in the province.

Under the circumstances and with Russia keeping the offensive, king Tahmasp II had no choice but to negotiate. The Treaty of Saint Petersburg was signed just a few months later after even more territorial losses, confirming all Russian conquerings of Iran's territories in the North Caucasus, South Caucasus, and contemporary northern Iran as made during the war.

Peter was determined to keep Gilan, Mazandaran and the rest of the newly conquered territories from Iran in the Caucasus, and add them to Russia. In May 1724 the Tsar wrote to Matiushkin, Russian commander in Rasht, that he should invite "Armenia and other Christians, if there are such, to Gilan and Mazandaran and settle them, while Muslims should be very quietly, so that they would not know it, diminished in number as much as possible." Peter however never managed to fulfil these plans for the long-term future, for he died in 1725.

The town, alongside the rest of Gilan as well as the other Caspian Sea coast provinces of what is modern-day Iran, remained in Russian hands for a decade until the Treaty of Resht of 1732 concluded by the government of Peter the Great's successor, Tsarievna Anna of Russia, and the newly emerging Iranian general and leader Nader Shah. The Russian forces evacuated from Gilan and all other provinces that Peter had conquered in 1734.

== See also ==
- Battle of Gulnabad
- Battle of Damghan
- Military of the Afsharid dynasty of Persia
- Battle of Murche-Khort
- Battle of Khwar Pass
