= Shah Abbas =

Shah Abbas is the name of:

- Abbas I of Persia (1571–1629), Shah (ruler) of Iran, at apex of the Safavid dynasty
- Abbas II of Persia (1633–1666), Shah (ruler) of Iran, son of Shah Safi
- Abbas III of Persia (1732–1740), Shah (ruler) of Iran, son of Shah Tahmasb II
