= Tahmasp II's campaign of 1731 =

Disastrous Persian campaign into the Caucasus

Tahmasp's campaign
- Part of Nader's Campaigns and the Ottoman–Persian War (1730–1735)
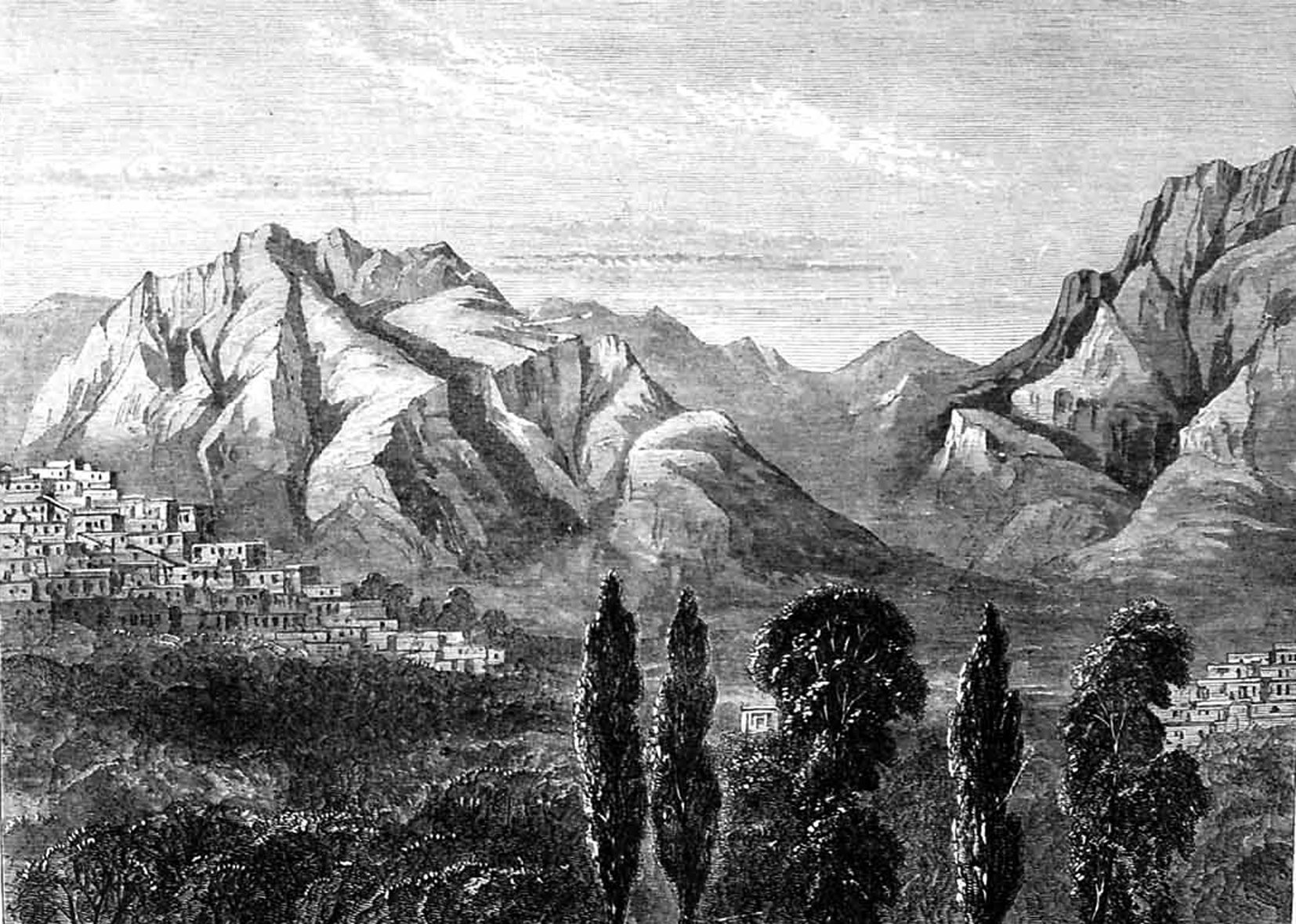
- A view of Kermanshah in western Persia
Date	1731
Location	Western Persia, Armenia
Result	Ottoman victory
Territorial changes	Western Persia falls back into Ottoman hands once more

Belligerents
(Safavid Iran) Safavid Empire	Ottoman Empire

Commanders and leaders
Tahmasp II	Hekimoğlu Ali Pasha; Ahmad Pasha

Strength
18,000	Unknown

Casualties and losses
Heavy	Light

The campaign of 1731 was a failed attempt by Tahmasp II of the Safavid dynasty to launch an offensive into Ottoman held Caucasus which ended in a disastrous defeat with all of Nader's gains during the previous year being lost. The result of this particular military catastrophe was still overturned with Nader's return from the east but would have much more significant impact on the Safavid dynasty itself as Tahmasp II sealed his own fate by initiating this ill fated expedition.

== Background ==
Nader had to cancel his planned invasion of Ottoman held Caucasus territory in light of the fact that the Abdali Afghans had rebelled and invaded Khorasan, besieging its provincial capital Mashad. Gathering and training new recruits during the winter of 1731 in northern Persia he set out eastwards to secure the right flank of the empire. Tahmasp II who sat observantly on the newly regained throne (which he owed to Nader) was cajoled by his courtiers into taking to the field himself. Although Michael Axworthy and many other historians accuse Tahmasp of being motivated primarily by jealousies caused by his illustrious commander-in-chief's incessant victories there is reason to suspect his decision was in fact induced by court intrigue amongst the imperial entourage eager to have their Shah outshine Nader and thereby lessen his influence.

== Campaign and Siege of Yerevan ==
At this time in Constantinople, Patrona Halil, a mob rebellion had produced a change in leadership bringing Mahmud I to power. Sultan Mahmud I appointed a half-Venetian statesman to command in the east at the head of an army which would prove Tahmasp's undoing. Aiming to cloak the Caucasus under Persian hegemony as in the time of his forefathers Tahmasp aimed to conquer Armenia, Georgia and Daghestan from the Turks. An army of 18,000 was led into Armenia were Tahmasp found himself scoring a victory over an Ottoman army near Yerevan.

Hakimoghlu Khan reacted immediately by setting out to break the siege of Yerevan. Realizing Tahmasp had not taken any precaution to guard his line of communication southwards Hakimoghlu cut Tahmasp's logistical line to Tabriz forcing him to withdraw break of the siege and take the road back to Tabriz. Hearing of Ahmad Pasha entering west Persia with the intention of taking Kermanshah and Hamadan, Tahmasp was now caught in a dire situation. As the Persian and Ottoman armies came into view of each other numerous letters were being exchanged between Ahmad Pasha and Tahmasp. The Persian army was largely composed of raw recruits (the veterans campaigning far in the east under Nader) and was formed up in the traditional manner of three divisions making up the centre and the flanks.

There seems to have been an unintentional initiation of musketry by the inexperienced Persian infantry leading to a pitched battle where the Persian cavalry on either flank overcame their counterparts but were let down by the nervous infantry in the centre who were easily put to flight by the advance of the Janissaries which now turned to aid their mounted comrades in a counter-attack on the Persian horsemen routing them in turn also. Tabriz also fell to Hakimoghlu Khan with Ahmad Pasha complementing his gains by capturing Hamadan.

== Aftermath ==
Tahmasp was obliged to sign a treaty by which he accepted Ottoman suzerainty over the Caucasus and in exchange he would be given back Tabriz, Hamadan and Kermanshah. Despite this, the conclusion of the campaign was still one of the most humiliating outcomes his dynasty had ever been forced to endure.

On hearing news of the disastrous campaign that had unfolded in the West, Nader Shah abandoned his conquests in the east in order to return to Isfahan, angered at the Shah's disastrous handling of the campaign which had undone all of Nader's achievements against the Ottomans during the previous year. This gave Nader the political capital to force Tahmasp to abdicate the throne in favour of his infant son Abbas III, in effect making Nader the supreme and unchallenged authority in the realm, paving his way for his eventual overthrow of the Safavid dynasty altogether.

== See also ==
- Military of the Afsharid dynasty of Persia
- Tahmasp II
- Ottoman–Persian War (1730–1735)
- Western Persia campaign of 1730
