= Battle of Zarghan =

1730 battle

- Part of Nader's Campaigns
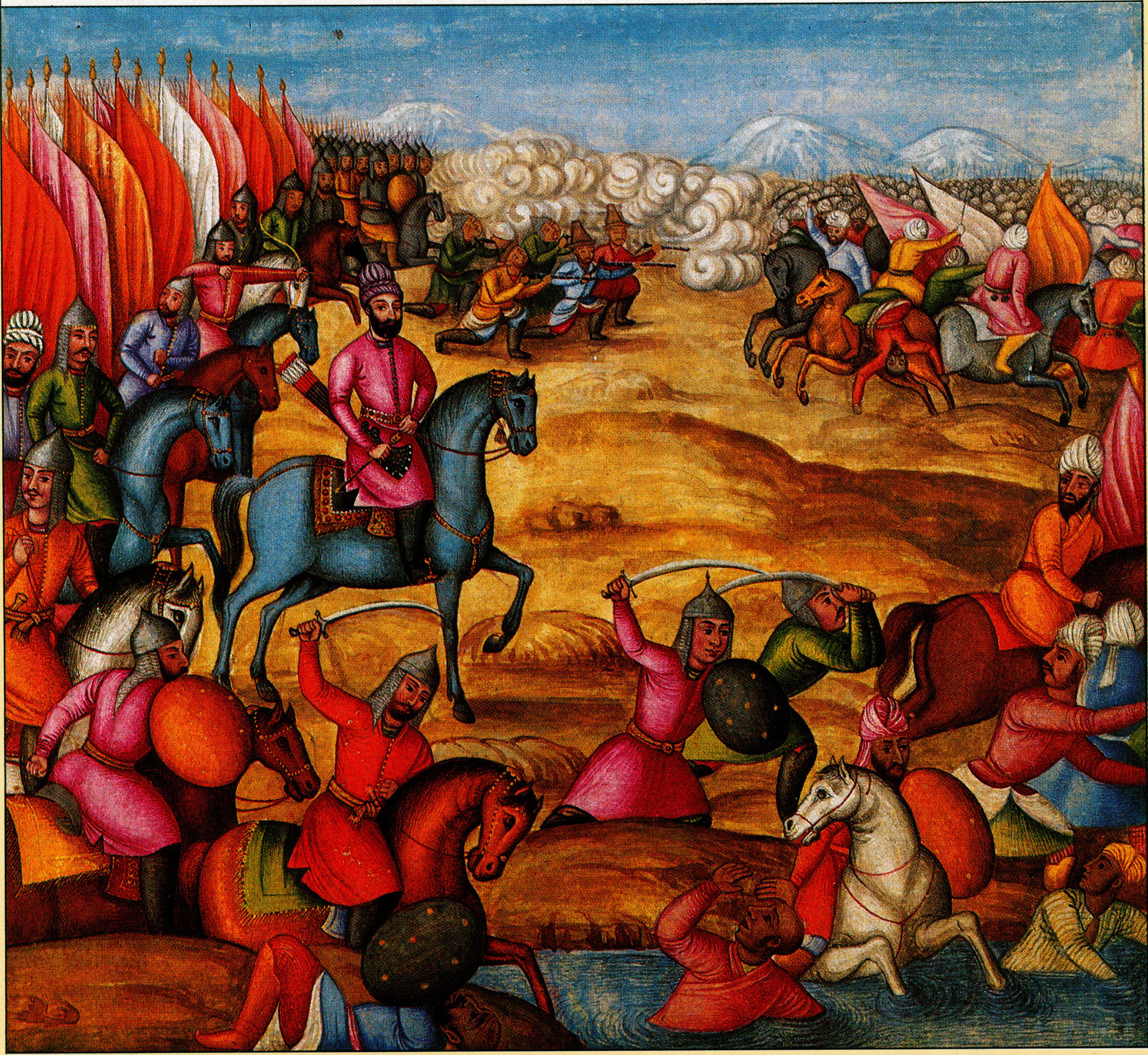
- Illustration of the battle showing Nader leading his troops against the Afghans
| Date | 15 January 1730 |
| Location | Zarghan, Shiraz County, Southern Persia |
| Result | Safavid victory |

Belligerents
| Safavid Iran | Hotak dynasty local Arab tribes |

Commanders and leaders
| Nader | Ashraf Hotak |

Strength
| 20,000–30,000 | 10,000–20,000 |

Casualties and losses
| Unknown | Unknown |

The Battle of Zarghan (Persian: نبرد زرگان) was the last battle of Ashraf Hotak's career as a statesman. Having been repeatedly bludgeoned by Nader's army through the Battles of Mehmandoost and Murche-Khort, Ashraf had withdrawn from Isfahan and escaped south to Shiraz to rebuild his army in an ultimately futile attempt to reverse his fortunes. Although he found some local support amongst a few tribes, he was decisively beaten, for the last time, after which he disappeared from Persia as well as the historical records, with no consensus being reached concerning the manner of his demise.

== See also ==
- Battle of Gulnabad
- Battle of Murche-Khort
- Battle of Khwar Pass
