= Liberation of Isfahan =

Direct result of Battle of Murche-Khort

- Part of Nader's Campaigns
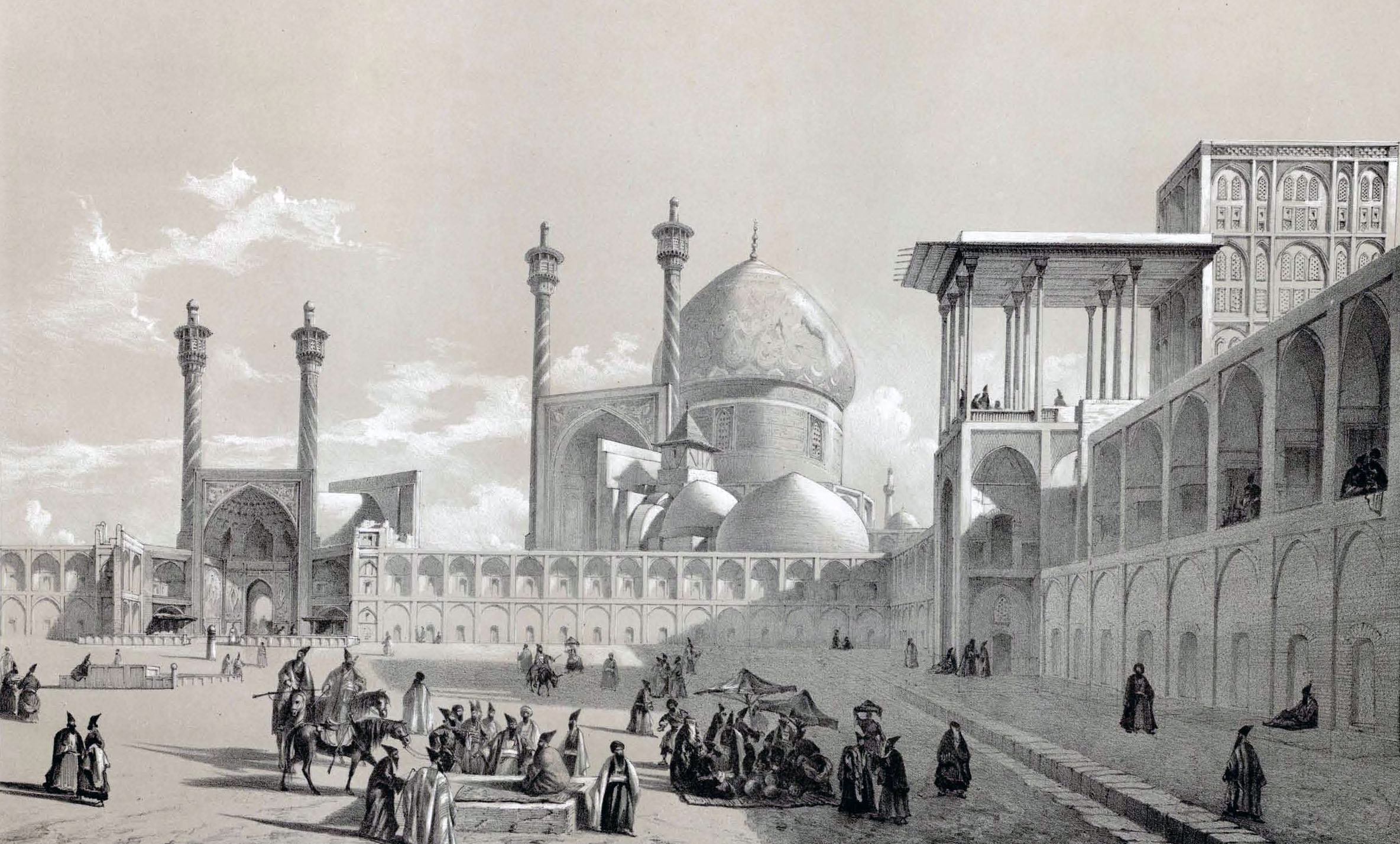
- Royal Square, Isfahan during the eighteenth century
| Date | 16 November 1729 |
| Location | Iran |
| Result | Liberation of Safavid Iran's capital Tahmasp II is restored to the Iranian throne until 1732 |

Belligerents
| Safavid loyalists | Hotaki dynasty |

Commanders and leaders
| Nader | Ashraf Hotak |

Casualties and losses
- All Afghan troops massacred

The liberation of Isfahan (Persian: آزادسازی اصفهان) was a direct result of the Battle of Murche-Khort in which the Iranian army under Nader attacked and routed Ashraf Hotak's Afghan army. The day after Murche-Khort on 16 November 1729, Nader marched his army into Isfahan where the looting and mob violence that had gripped the city in the chaotic aftermath of Ashraf's departure ceased immediately. Order was restored with many of the Afghans hiding throughout the city being dragged through the streets and massacred without mercy in reprisals.

== Tahmasp II regains the Safavid capital ==
On 9 December 1729, Nader awaited outside the city gates for the Shah's arrival. Tahmasp II was received in a ceremony in which as soon as he reached Nader's person he "dismounted from his horse in a show of respect whence Nader did likewise rushing forth to dissuade the Shah from his magnanimous deed, however the Shah insisted they walk together and expressed an inability to reward Nader's ceaseless service to him. After a few more minutes of polite conversation the Shah remounted his steed and led the way back into the city with Nader following close behind".

The Shah's return was greeted with much jubilation from the citizens of Isfahan. Tahmasp, however, was reduced to tears when he witnessed the destitution and abject conditions of the capital.

== See also ==
- Battle of Damghan (1729)
- Battle of Murche-Khort
- Safavid dynasty
