= Battle of Khwar Pass =

1729 battle

- Part of Nader's Campaigns
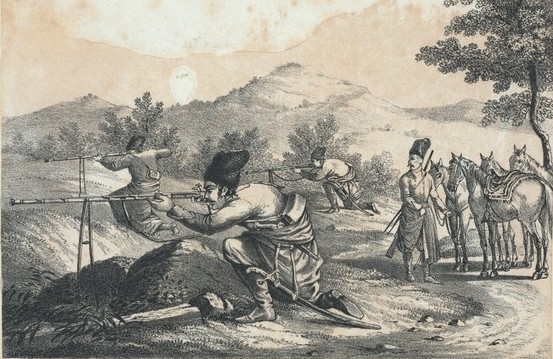
- Persian sharpshooters
Date	October 1729
Location	Khwar Pass, east of Varamin, Persia
Result	Safavid victory

Belligerents
Safavid Iran	Hotak dynasty

Commanders and leaders
Nader Shah	Ashraf Hotak

Strength
Unknown	Unknown

Casualties and losses
Minimal	Heavy: All guns and baggage captured

The Battle of Khwar Pass (Persian: نبرد سردر خوار) was a failed ambush set up by Ashraf Hotaki during his retreat following his defeat at the Battle of Damghan (1729). Gathering the forces available along his route, Ashraf assembled another substantial fighting force from the remnants of his army. He also had enough troops to establish an ambush at a narrow pass east of Varamin.

Nader, having learned of Ashraf's preparations, approached the pass with caution and avoided being caught in the ambush. The failure of the ambush forced Ashraf's forces to withdraw, abandoning their guns and baggage. The encounter further weakened Ashraf's army during his retreat from central Persia.

== Battle ==
Placing hidden guns and sharpshooters on the high ground overlooking the pass and fortifying the narrow pathway Ashraf even left a significant body of cavalry behind in order to hunt down the survivors of the ambush. Nader's spies however reported on Ashraf's designs at Khwar. Skirting around the ambush Nader, personally taking command, launched a two-pronged assault utilizing musketeers with artillery support, catching the Afghans in an ambush of his own, forcing the Pashtuns to flee leaving their guns and baggage behind.

== Consequences ==
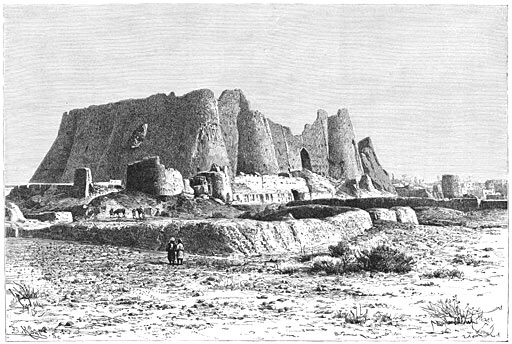
The Four-cornered Citadel of Varamin as seen by Jane Dieulafoy

As a result of the battle, Nader's advance into the heart of Iran and onto the capital Isfahan lay open. Nader however chose to take a longer route further to the west for reasons of superior logistical support. This also had the benefit of surprise with the defeated Afghans unable to mount a serious obstacle to Nader's advance on Isfahan until he had already reached Murcheh-Khort, a town just a mere few kilometres north of Isfahan itself.

== See also ==
- Battle of Murche-Khort
- Liberation of Isfahan
- Battle of Zarghan

== Sources ==
- Michael Axworthy, The Sword of Persia: Nader Shah, from Tribal Warrior to Conquering Tyrant Hardcover 348 pages (26 July 2006) Publisher: I.B. Tauris Language: English ISBN 1-85043-706-8
