= Battle of Murche-Khort =

1729 battle

- Part of the Campaigns of Nader Shah
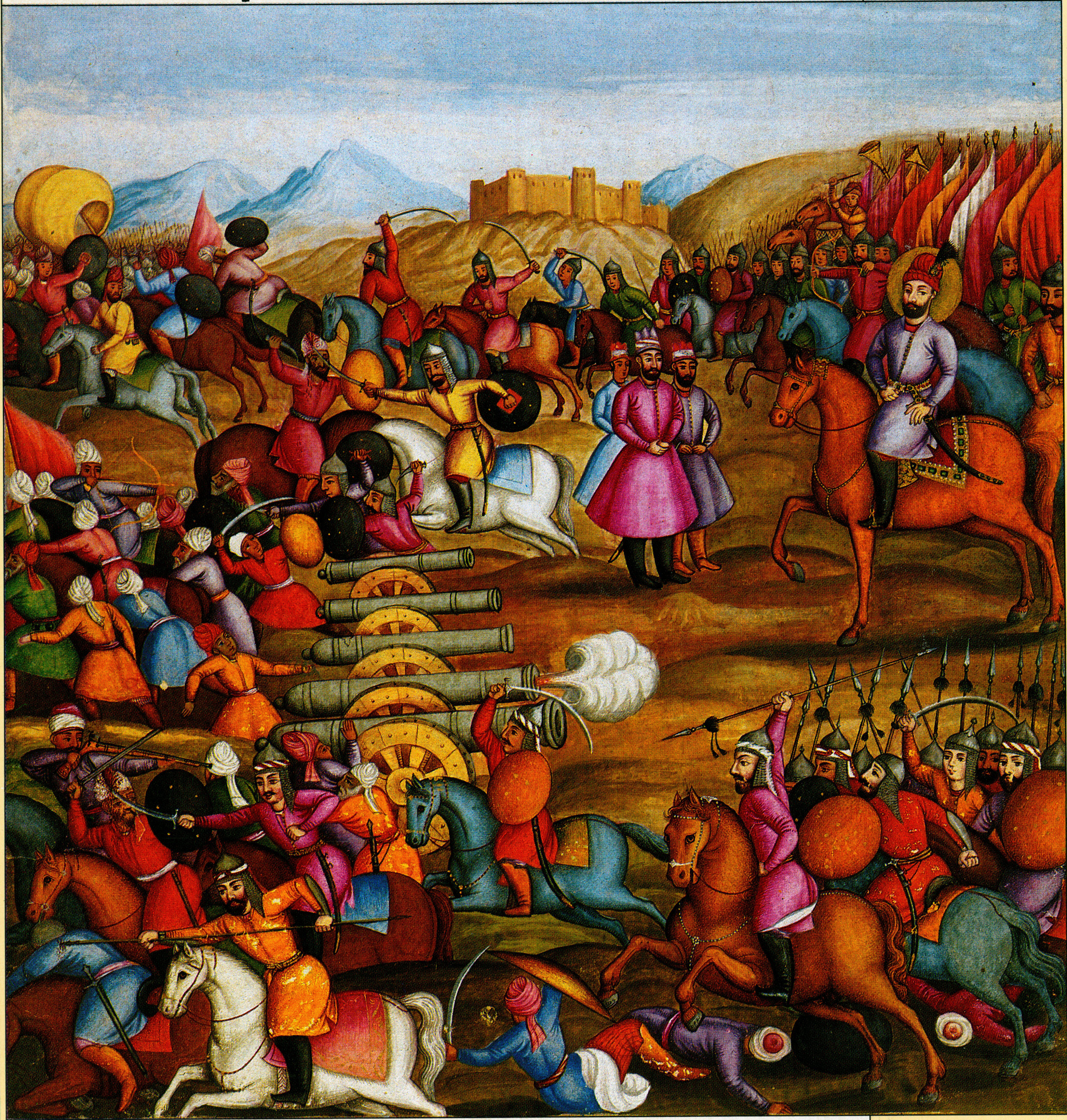
- Persian under Nader attacking Afghans
Date	12 November 1729
Location	Murche-Khort, Central Iran
Result	Safavid victory
Territorial changes	Liberation of Isfahan

Belligerents
Safavid Iran	Hotak dynasty Supported by: Ottoman Empire

Commanders and leaders
Nader	Ashraf Hotak

Strength
20,000–30,000; 40,000 at Kashan (Otter)	40,000-15,000: 250 artillery pieces

Casualties and losses
Minimal	4,000 killed, injured or missing in total

The Battle of Murche-Khort (Persian: نبرد مورچهخورت) was the last decisive engagement of Nader's campaign to restore Tahmasp II to the Iranian throne. Ashraf Hotak had failed to arrest Nader's advance onto Isfahan at Khwar pass where his ambush was discovered, surrounded and ambushed itself. The battle was fought in an uncharacteristic manner by the Afghans who to some extent sought to replicate their foes tactical systems which had so badly devastated their armies up to this point. Victory opened a clear road south towards Isfahan and the return of Safavid rule for a few brief years before Nader himself would overthrow it In 1736 and appointed himself as Shah, establishing the Afsharid dynasty.

== Background ==
=== Events in Isfahan ===
Ashraf's arrival in Isfahan heralded a massacre of over 3,000 Iranian aristocrats & clergymen carried out in the cruel, cold calculation that his catastrophic defeat at Mihmandoost would encourage an uprising in Isfahan as soon as he were to ride out of the city with his army to meet Nader's forces which were bearing down on Isfahan.

Removing any potential leaders of revolt in Isfahan ensured that he would not be caught between the Iranian army in the north and a resurgent Isfahan in the south.

=== Ottoman support ===
After his crushing victories against the Ghilzai Afghans in northern Iran, Nader wrote letters to the Ottomans requesting the immediate withdrawal from historic Safavid lands which they had acquired from Ashraf by the Treaty of Hamadan. Realizing the threat of a resurgent Iran on their eastern border the Ottomans responded to Ashraf's requests for help, sending him both guns and artillerymen. On 31 October 1729, having augmented his army's fire power substantially with Ottoman aid Ashraf marched out of an Isfahan even more destitute than at the time of Mahmud's siege.

== Battle ==
=== Deployment ===
Moving north the Afghans reached a defensible position near Murche-Khort approximately 55 kilometres north of Isfahan. On 13 November 1729, Nader's army came into view. Observing the strength of the entrenched position Ashraf had selected, Nader attempted to lure him out first by artillery fire and then by marching around him and towards Isfahan. Alas this ruse met with no more success than the first.

Ashraf was far too cunning to be duped in this manner and in fact had done excellently in devising a new approach to counter Nader's seemingly invincible system which was evidently immune to the thundering charge of Afghan horsemen which had swept all before it in previous engagements, even the Ottomans. Recognizing that any attack on the Iranian army was doomed to failure, Ashraf deployed his artillery in a circular fashion all around his centre which was a long line of entrenched infantry, in effect giving him a pivot to manoeuvre his cavalry around.

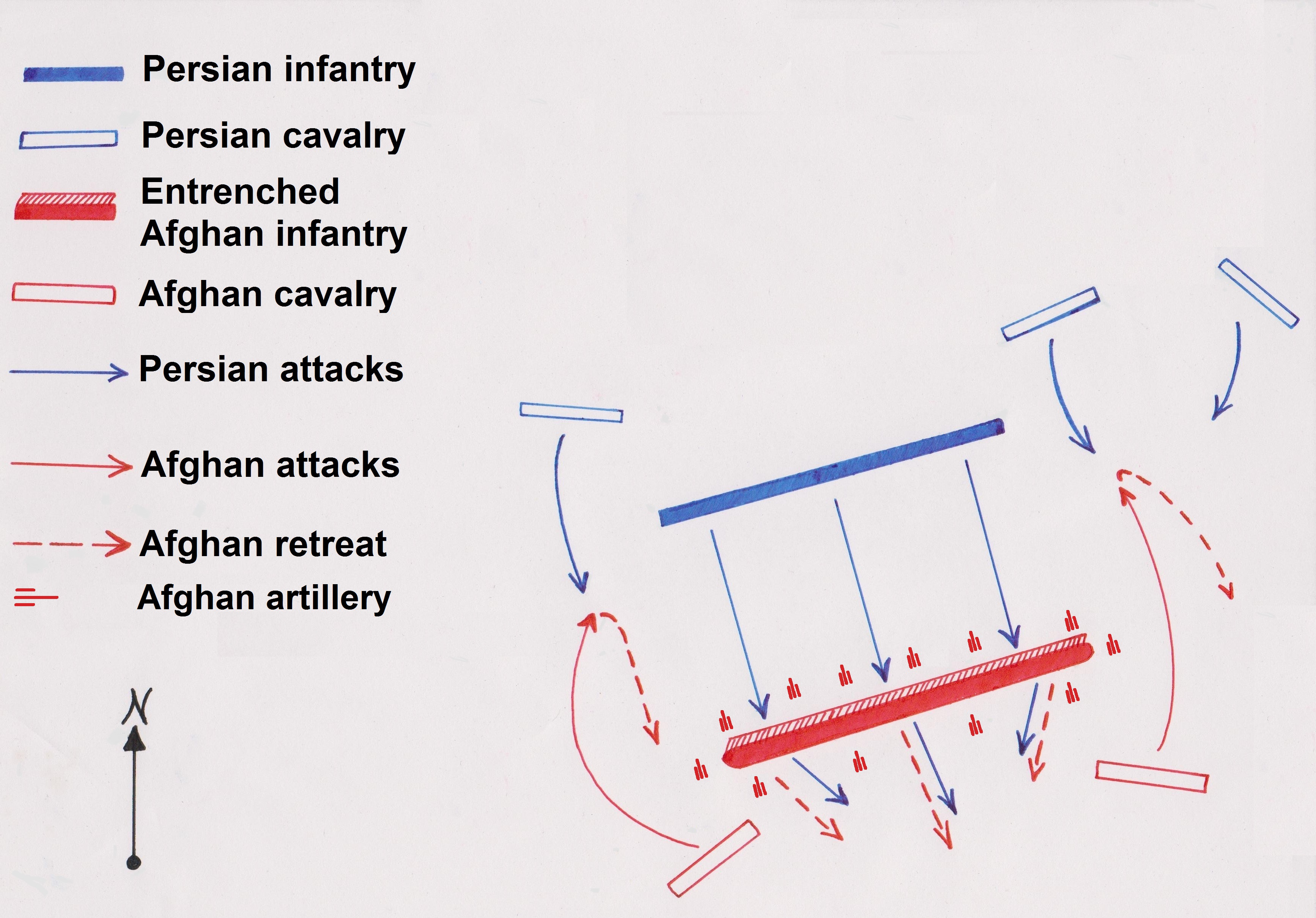
1. Nader dispatches a contingent of cavalry to keep the Afghan cavalry on the eastern wing in check; 2. Iranian line infantry advance on their entrenched Afghan counterparts and charge into hand-to-hand combat after firing a few devastating volleys at close range; 3. Numerous attempts by Ashraf's cavalry to flank the Iranian infantry are foiled by Nader's cavalry reserves; 4. The Afghan infantry finally crumbles under pressure from the Iranian centre and Ashraf's attempts to rally them prove in vain, ending the battle in the Iranian's favour

=== Engagement ===
Nader drew up his Jazāyerchi (musketeers) in a line corresponding to that of their entrenched foes. He sent a contingent of cavalry under Haj Beg Afshar around to the east to menace the Afghan right flank and kept the rest of his cavalry in reserve in order foil any attempt by Ashraf to flank or disrupt his musketeers onslaught against the Afghan infantry in the centre. The uniform advance of the Jazāyerchi was little affected by either Afghan musketry and cannon fire, continuing right up to the trenches where they unleashed deadly volleys at close range before drawing swords and coming to grips with the enemy.

No effort was spared by Ashraf to try and relieve the pressure from his infantry in the centre and many charges were made by his cavalry against the Iranian infantry's flank and rear but were all intercepted and thrown back by Nader's cavalry reserve. Eventually the centre of the Afghan army dissolved under pressure and Ashraf having done his utmost to keep order amongst his unravelling army was forced to concede another crushing defeat, leading him to flee with the utmost urgency in order to reach Isfahan before Nader.

== Aftermath ==
Such was the panic-stricken haste with which Ashraf and his entourage fled to Isfahan that they rode through the city gates that very afternoon, fresh from their defeat at Murche-Khort. Scrambling for any items of value he loaded as much as he could onto as many four-legged beasts as he could find and, along with a few Safavid princesses, left Isfahan for Shiraz at dawn. The Ottoman artillerymen who had become Nader's prisoners were treated with mercy and permitted to journey home.

== Otter's account ==
The Swedish traveller Jean Otter, who was in Persia in the late 1730s, included a short account of the campaign in his Voyage en Turquie et en Perse (1748). He wrote that towns and whole provinces declared for Tahmasp as Nader came south, driving out their Afghans, so that troops and money reached him from every side. By the time he got to Kashan his army numbered 40,000.

Otter explains Ashraf's decision to fight in the open. He feared being shut up in a conquered city that still held enough of its old inhabitants to rise against him, with the prince's army at the gates. He therefore took the field and posted himself at "Mourtcha-Khor" to wait for the Persians. Nader came looking for him there, attacked and beat him, and Ashraf fled back to Isfahan at full gallop.

According to Otter, Ashraf then meant to carry out a general massacre, set fire to the city and leave with his treasure. Nader saw what he intended and followed close behind to stop it. Told by his spies that the Persian army was coming on fast, Ashraf ordered every Afghan out of the city. They left in such a hurry that they could take only their most valuable belongings. Tahmasp's army entered Isfahan the next day. Otter dates these events to November 1730, a year too late.

== See also ==
- Military of Afsharid Iran
- Restoration of Tahmasp II to the Safavid throne
- Battle of Damghan (1729)
- Battle of Khwar Pass
- Hotak dynasty
