= Battle of Damghan =

Battle of Damghan may refer to:

- Battle of Damghan (1063)
- Battle of Damghan (1447)
- Battle of Damghan (1729)
