= Ottoman–Hotaki War (1726–1727) =

Conflict in southern Asia

Ottoman–Hotaki War of 1726–1727
- 1730 map of the Persian Empire by Guillaume Delisle.
Date	1726–1727
Location	Hamedan, Azerbaijan, South Caucasus
Result	See outcome; Treaty of Hamedan

Belligerents
(Emirate of Afghanistan) Hotak Empire	Ottoman Empire

Commanders and leaders
(Emirate of Afghanistan) Ashraf Hotak	Ahmed III; Hekimoğlu Ali Pasha; Ahmad Pasha; Bebek Sulaiman Oglu

Strength
12,000 (Axworthy); 17,000 (Lockhart)	70,000–80,000; Estimates up to 300,000; Heavy artillery

Casualties and losses
Unknown	38,000 casualties; 18,000 dead; 20,000 deserted

The Ottoman Empire and the Hotak dynasty fought over control of the western and northwestern parts of Iran throughout 1726 and 1727. The Afghan Hotaks had overthrown the Safavid dynasty from power in Persia and began centralizing rule in Iran after the Battle of Gulnabad and Siege of Isfahan. The Ottomans capitalized off the Hotak expansion to invade the waning Safavids, which brought conflict with the Hotaks, who saw themselves as the legitimate rulers of all Persia, and demanded the Ottomans withdraw. The Hotaks further made demands that the Ottomans rejected, who declared war in response.

A numerically superior Ottoman force was assembled under Ahmad Pasha, and began their invasion of Persia. The Afghans assembled their own force under Ashraf Hotak, albeit numerically inferior, and met for battle at Khorramabad. Defections and low morale plagued the Ottoman ranks, and much of their army refused to obey commands, with Ottoman assaults being repelled by the Afghans, eventually forcing Ahmad Pasha to withdraw back to Baghdad with heavy casualties.

A peace treaty was made, with the Afghans being recognized as rulers of all Persia by the Ottomans, as well as ceding lands gained back to the Ottomans after the Hotak military victories.

== Background ==
The Hotak dynasty was founded in 1709 by the Ghilzai of Kandahar under Mirwais Hotak who led a successful revolution against their Safavid suzerains. They had gained control over parts of modern Afghanistan, and later Iran under Mahmud Hotak from 1722 to 1729, after having taken advantage of the heavily declining, Safavid dynasty of Iran. The Safavids had been severely declining in the first decades of the 18th century stemming from economic crises prior decades, while many provinces in the empire had flung into open rebellion.

Subsequently, the Ottoman and Russian empires had taken advantage of Safavid decline to annex much of western Iran. During the Afghan invasion, the Russians under Peter I immediately launched a campaign against Iran, capturing and securing parts of Dagestan, Azerbaijan, and Gilan and having a claim on Astarabad due to the treaty of St. Petersburg. The Russian occupation sparked tensions between the Ottoman and Russian empires, as the Ottomans did not want the Russians to proceed into the now-Turkish province of Shirvan governed by Hajji Dawud. However, through negotiations between the two tensions were reduced and in June 1724 the Treaty of Constantinople was signed. Russia and the Ottomans agreed to divide the regions captured from Iran.

The Ottomans proceeded to launch a campaign against the Safavids in the northwest. In 1723 Ibrahim Pasha captured the city of Tiflis, although guerilla resistance in the province continued for quite some time. In the late spring of 1724, Ahmed Pasha marched towards the city of Erevan, and eventually capturing it on September 28, 1724. Abraham writes that it fell on the 7th of June, with the citadel falling on 20 August. Ganja was conquered in September. In the summer of 1724, Khoy, Quschi, Tasuj, and Marand were all conquered by the Ottomans in the summer of 1724. In August 1724 Ottoman forces besieged Tabriz but were forced to retreat to Tasuj on September 30. However, Ottoman forces were reinforced and eventually were able to capture Tabriz in August 1725.

== Ottoman-Afghan Diplomacy ==
As Ottoman expansion into Persia continued, Ashraf Hotak, having recently toppled his brother, Mahmud Hotak from power, proclaimed himself as the sole legitimate ruler of all Persia, and demanded that the Ottomans cede all their annexed territories, further giving diplomatic insult in a given letter. The insult was not taken lightly by the Ottoman court, who were also uneasy of Afghan popularity in Istanbul due to their war against the Shia Safavids. The Ottoman Ulama declared the Afghan rulers as rebels and declared war. One of the main goals of the Ottomans was to restore the Safavid dynasty as a vassal state to the throne. War began as the Ottomans opened hostility in the Azerbaijan region in 1726.

== History ==
=== War ===
The Ottomans mobilized a large force, a figure placed between 70,000–80,000 men, with estimates as much as 300,000 strong. The Ottoman force also comprised a superior artillery force. Initially mobilized at Baghdad by its governor, Ahmad Pasha, the campaign against the Afghans commenced.

The Afghan army in turn, assembled a force estimated by Axworthy to be merely 12,000 in turn, with Lockhart estimating 17,000. The Afghans, excluding Zamburaks, had no artillery. Ashraf Hotak nonetheless set out to meet the Ottoman force.

As Ahmad Pasha advanced, he sent an insulting letter to Ashraf, calling the Afghans a "miserable and unworthy race", further stating that he was going to reinstate the rightful ruler of Persia (implying to restore the Safavids). Ashraf, in response, had the then captive former Safavid ruler, Soltan Hoseyn, executed and his head sent to Ahmad Pasha, replying that he would see his answer given with the point of his sword.

Ahmad Pasha continued his advance, shocked by the execution and determined to defeat Ashraf. Upon advancing roughly 80 miles from Hamadan, the Ottomans sighted the Afghans and both armies halted 12 miles apart. A delay for the Ottomans ensued, working toward the Afghan favor, with Ashraf sending men with bribes to the Kurdish contingents of the Ottoman army to defect. An attempted reconnaissance force of 6,000 men sent by Ahmad Pasha was also intentionally taken astray by their guides and were subsequently surrounded and massacred by the Afghans.

Four Afghan clerics had also infiltrated the Ottoman camp unharmed due to their age and berated Ahmad Pasha at his tent for allying with the Russians and pressured him to end his invasion against the Afghans, who were their fellow Sunni kin, instead suggesting Ahmad Pasha should direct his attacks on the Persians in conjunction with the Afghans in a holy war. The incident attracted attention especially amongst bystanders, before the clerics left, calling on Ahmad Pasha to end further bloodshed. Numerous deserters accompanied the Afghan clerics as they left.

Believing he had waited for far too long, Ahmad Pasha ordered a complete attack utilizing a signal of ten cannon shots, with the armies meeting for battle at Khorramabad. However, Ottoman morale was critically low, with most of the army refusing to advance. The Kurdish contingent of the Ottoman army, some 20,000 men under Bebek Sulaiman Oglu, completely deserted to the Afghans. Ahmad Pasha organized his forces and assaulted the Afghan right wing, but was completely repulsed, with the rest of his army remained. Ashraf maintained composure and mounted on an elephant playing a flute. Another two attempted Ottoman assaults were beaten and Ahmad Pasha was forced to withdraw, leaving 12,000 Ottoman dead on the field. Ashraf did not choose to follow up with a complete victory by pressing an attack, instead manufacturing another plan.

The same night of the withdrawal saw the Kurds who had not defected in the Ottoman camp create a disturbance causing utter disorder and panic, proclaiming that so many men had defected, they should immediately withdraw lest they face annihilation, with the Kurds pillaging the camp. Ahmad Pasha completely withdrew, leaving behind the entirety of the Ottoman artillery and baggage train, retreating first to Hamadan, Kermanshah, and then back to Baghdad.

Seeing the Ottomans in complete rout, Ashraf accompanied them on their march, hoping to reduce general Ottoman war support, whilst releasing prisoners of war that were captured.

Following these engagements, the Ottomans suffered a loss of morale, with rumors rising on how they were defeated, ranging from them being attacked by snakes with wings, to the sky pouring down flames upon the army, as well as claims that the Afghan Amir was using magic. In reality, however, the main reason was that the Ottomans and Hotaks were both Sunni, and many in the Ottoman army saw it wrong to fight another Sunni nation. Alongside this, the uncle of Ashraf Hotak, Mirwais Hotak, used the epithet Amir, and Ashraf Hotak had adopted the epithet of "Amir-Vais". When Turks heard the name, they were confused and believed that he was the Amir al-Mu'minin. As a result, the Ottoman forces were severely demoralized.

Ahmad Pasha attempted to continue the war in the summer of 1727, however he quickly found that the war was unpopular in Istanbul and with Muslims throughout Ottoman lands, who admired the Afghans and saw their victories as divine favor.

The Ottomans would later blame their defeat on the conduct of the Kurds, who were given promises by the Afghans, with numerous defecting.

== Outcome ==
Preferring to not continue the war, Ashraf Hotak began negotiating a peace settlement. The Hotaks had obtained a military victory in the war against the Ottomans, with Ashraf also officially being recognized as Shah by the Ottomans. Alongside this, pilgrimage caravans sent by the Afghans would be protected by the Ottomans. The Ottoman occupied Persian territories were also recognized by Ashraf. The Afghans withdrew from territories gained following their victories, with the Ottomans assuming control of Zanjan, Soltaniyeh, and Abhar.

The recognition as the legitimate Shah of Persia by the Ottomans, who were seen as the chief authority in the Muslim world, saw a significant bolster to Ashraf's prestige and authority, with Axworthy referring to it as a triumph for Ashraf. Lockhart remarked that although the treaty served effectively as a compromise, it was very acceptable for Ashraf.

== Aftermath ==
The war allowed Ashraf Hotak to unite and gain support from his Kurdish and Zoroastrian populations, and even Shia Shahsevan tribes. Nonetheless, the Afghans were still in great majority, seen as usurpers by the Iranian populace. As a result, this sparked internal revolts and weakened the strength of the Afghans and their administration based in Isfahan. With the rise of Nader Shah, and after numerous engagements, the Afghan armies were defeated and forced back on Isfahan. On 21 November 1729, Isfahan was freed from Afghan rule.

== See also ==
- Treaty of Constantinople (1724) – Treaty between the Ottoman Empire and the Russian Empire, dividing large portions of the territory of Persia between them during the decline of Safavid Persia.

== Sources ==
- Axworthy, Michael (2009). The Sword of Persia: Nader Shah, from Tribal Warrior to Conquering Tyrant. Bloomsbury Academic. ISBN 978-1-84511-982-9.
- Balland, D. (1987). "AŠRAF ḠILZAY". In Yarshater, Ehsan (ed.). Encyclopædia Iranica. Vol. II/8: Aśoka IV–Āṯār al-Wozarāʾ. London and New York: Routledge & Kegan Paul. pp. 796–797. ISBN 978-0-71009-108-6.
- El-Merheb, Mohamad; Berriah, Mehdi (2021). Professional Mobility in Islamic Societies (700-1750): New Concepts and Approaches. BRILL. ISBN 978-90-04-46763-7.
- Hanifi, M. Jamil (2001). "ḠILZĪ". In Yarshater, Ehsan (ed.). Encyclopædia Iranica. Vol. X/6: Germany VI–Gindaros. London and New York: Routledge & Kegan Paul. pp. 670–672. ISBN 978-0-933273-55-9.
- Lee, Jonathan L. (2019-01-15). Afghanistan: A History from 1260 to the Present. Reaktion Books. ISBN 978-1-78914-010-1.
- Lockhart, Laurence (1958). The Fall of the Ṣafavī Dynasty and the Afghan Occupation of Persia. Cambridge: Cambridge University Press.
- Mikaberidze, Alexander (2011). Conflict and Conquest in the Islamic World: A Historical Encyclopedia [2 volumes]: A Historical Encyclopedia. ABC-CLIO. ISBN 978-1-59884-337-8.
- Zarinebaf, Fariba (1991). Tabriz Under Ottoman Rule (1725–1730) (Thesis). Chicago, Ill.: University of Chicago.
