= Abbas III =

Safavid Shah of Iran (1732-c.1740) (r.1732-1736)

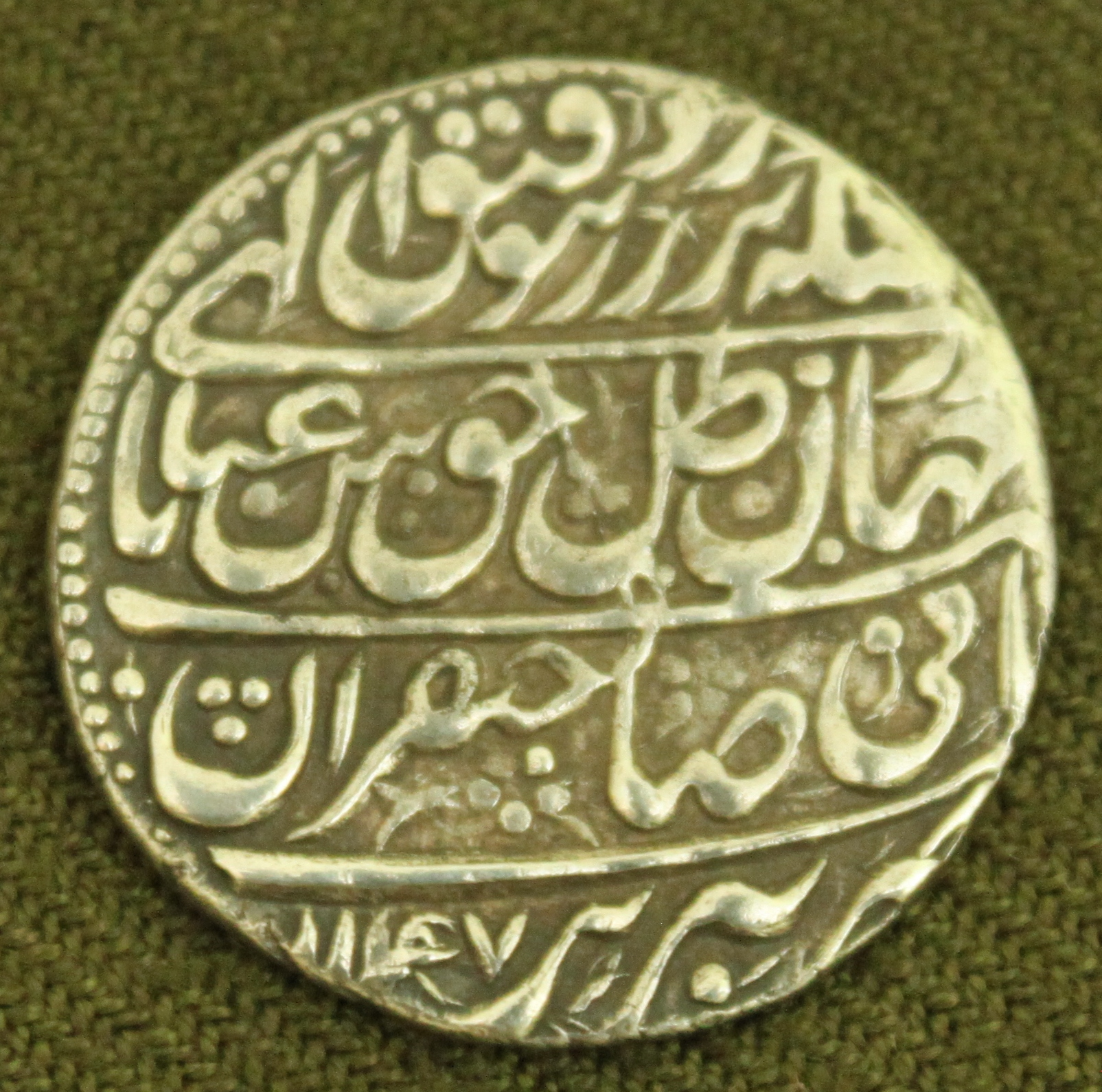

Shah of Iran
- Reign: 16 April 1732 – 22 January 1736
- Coronation: 7 September 1732
- Predecessor: Tahmasp II
- Successor: Nader Shah
- Born: January 1732; Safavid Iran
- Died: February 1740 (aged 8); Sabzevar, Afsharid Iran
- Burial: Fatima Masumeh Shrine
- Dynasty: Safavid
- Father: Tahmasp II
- Mother: Shahpari Begum
- Religion: Shia Islam

Abbas III (Persian: شاه عباس سوم, romanized: ʿAbbās; January 1732 – February 1740) was a son of Shah Tahmasp II and Shahpari Begum of the Safavid dynasty and reigned from 1732 to 1736. After the deposition of his father by Nader Khan (the future Nader Shah) the infant Abbas was appointed nominal ruler of Iran on 7 September 1732. Nader Khan, who was the real ruler of the country, assumed the positions of deputy of state and viceroy. Abbas III was deposed in March 1736, when Nader Khan had himself crowned as Nader Shah. This marked the official end of the Safavid dynasty. Abbas was sent to join his father in prison in Sabzevar, Khorasan.

In 1738, Nader Shah set out on campaign to Afghanistan and India, leaving his son Reza Qoli Mirza Afshar to rule his realm in his absence. Hearing rumours that his father had died, Reza made preparations for assuming the crown. According to the most "authoritative account", Mohammed Hosein Khan Qajar, who had been entrusted with supervising Abbas and his father in captivity, warned Reza that on hearing the news of Nader's death, the townspeople of Sabzevar would rise up in revolt, free Tahmasp II and place him on the throne again. Reza gave Mohammed Hosein orders to execute Tahmasp and his sons to forestall this.

Mohammed Hosein strangled Tahmasp, cut the young Abbas down with his sword and also had his brother Esmail killed. According to Michael Axworthy, the dating of these events is speculative, but they probably took place in May or June 1739, or 1740.

== Bibliography ==
- Axworthy, Michael (2006). Sword of Persia: Nader Shah, From Tribal Warrior to Conquering Tyrant. London: IB Tauris. ISBN 1-84511-982-7.
- Lockhart, L. (1938). Nadir Shah. London.
- Savory, R. M. Encyclopaedia Iranica.

Regnal titles
Preceded by Tahmasp II	Shah of Iran; 1732–1736	Succeeded by Nadir Shah Afshar
Preceded by Tahmasp II	Head of Safavid dynasty 1732–1736	Succeeded by Suleiman II (Pretender)
