= Military of Afsharid Iran =

Army of the Afsharid Empire

Afsharid Military
- Nader Shah's battle standard
- Active: 1736–1747 (national military); 1747–1796 (dynastic military only)
- Country: Afsharid Iran
- Allegiance: Shahanshah (King of Kings)
- Branch: Armed forces
- Type: Land forces, navy
- Size: 375,000 at its peak
- Garrison/HQ: Mashhad
- Patron: Shahanshah of the Persian Empire
- Engagements: Nader's Campaigns

Commanders
- Notable commanders: Nader Shah, Ebrahim Khan Afshar, Tahmasp Khan Jalayer, Reza Qoli Mirza Afshar, Adil Shah, Ahmad Shah Abdali, Nasrollah Qoli Khan Afshar, Mohammed Khan Baloch, Fath-Ali Khan Afshar, Heraclius II of Georgia

The military of Afsharid Iran had their origins in the relatively obscure yet bloody inter-factional violence in Khorasan during the collapse of the Safavid state. The small band of warriors under local warlord Nader Qoli of the Turkoman Afshar tribe in north-east Iran were no more than a few hundred men. Yet at the height of Nader's power as the king of kings, Shahanshah, he commanded an army of 375,000 fighting men which, according to Axworthy, constituted the single most powerful military force of its time, led by one of the most talented and successful military leaders of history.

After Nader Shah's assassination at the hands of a faction of his officers in 1747, his powerful army fractured as the Afsharid state collapsed and the country plunged into decades of civil war. Although there were numerous Afsharid pretenders to the throne, (amongst many others), who attempted to regain control of the entire country, Iran remained a fractured political entity in turmoil until the campaigns of Agha Mohammad Khan Qajar towards the very end of the 18th century reunified the nation.

== Overview ==
The Afsharid army was always a primarily cavalry-based force. It peaked at 375,000 men in 1743, an unsustainable figure that led to the collapse of the empire's economy. Its most notable change compared to the Safavids was the use of firearms. While the Safavids had established a core of musketeers and artillerymen in the 16th century, up to the mid-18th century these men were outnumbered by hosts of mounted warriors armed with lances, swords, and bows supplied from the nomadic and semi-nomadic tribes of the regions. Many of the Shah's household troops continued to be equipped with the same traditional weapons, eschewing the carbines and pistols taken up by European cavalry in the same period. It was under Nader Shah that the majority of troops in the army were equipped with firearms for the first time, necessitating a greater emphasis on drill and training, characteristic of developments that had taken place in Europe in the previous century.

At the peak of its size; there were 60,000 Turkmen and Uzbeks, 70,000 Afghans, 65,000 troops from Khorasan, 120,000 troops of various ethnicities from western Iran (Kurdestan, Hamadan, Lorestan, Bakhtaran, Fars, and Khuzestan), and 60,000 from Azerbaijan and the rest of the Caucasus. Most of these troops were light cavalry. The light cavalry wore four-cornered hats (kulah-e Naderi) eighteen inches high, with a goat skin or sheepskin wound round it; a woolen cloak on their shoulders; an open shirt red, yellow, or green in color; short breeches; and leather boots. Many also wore armor, both mail and plate. Each light cavalryman was armed with a saber, a musket, and an axe. Some also carried shields. In 1744, Nader's army included 13,000 guard cavalry, 20,000 cavalry from Nader's own Afshar tribe, 50,000 Afghan cavalry, 12,000 jazayerchis, 40,000 ordinary foot musketeers, and undisclosed numbers of artillery troops, garrison troops, and men from other tribes like the Qajars. Most soldiers were armed with flintlock or older miquelet lock muskets, with some having matchlocks, and every soldier also carried a sword. The infantry did not use bayonets. The Afghans may have been largely without firearms, being shock cavalry whose primary weapon was the lance. A portion of the Turkic and Iranic light cavalry may have also lacked firearms, relying on lances, sabers, and bows.

Strength on paper of the Afsharid army
Year	Army	±% p.a.
1729	25,000	—
1733	100,000	+41.42%
1736	150,000	+14.47%
1743	375,000	+13.99%

== Infantry ==
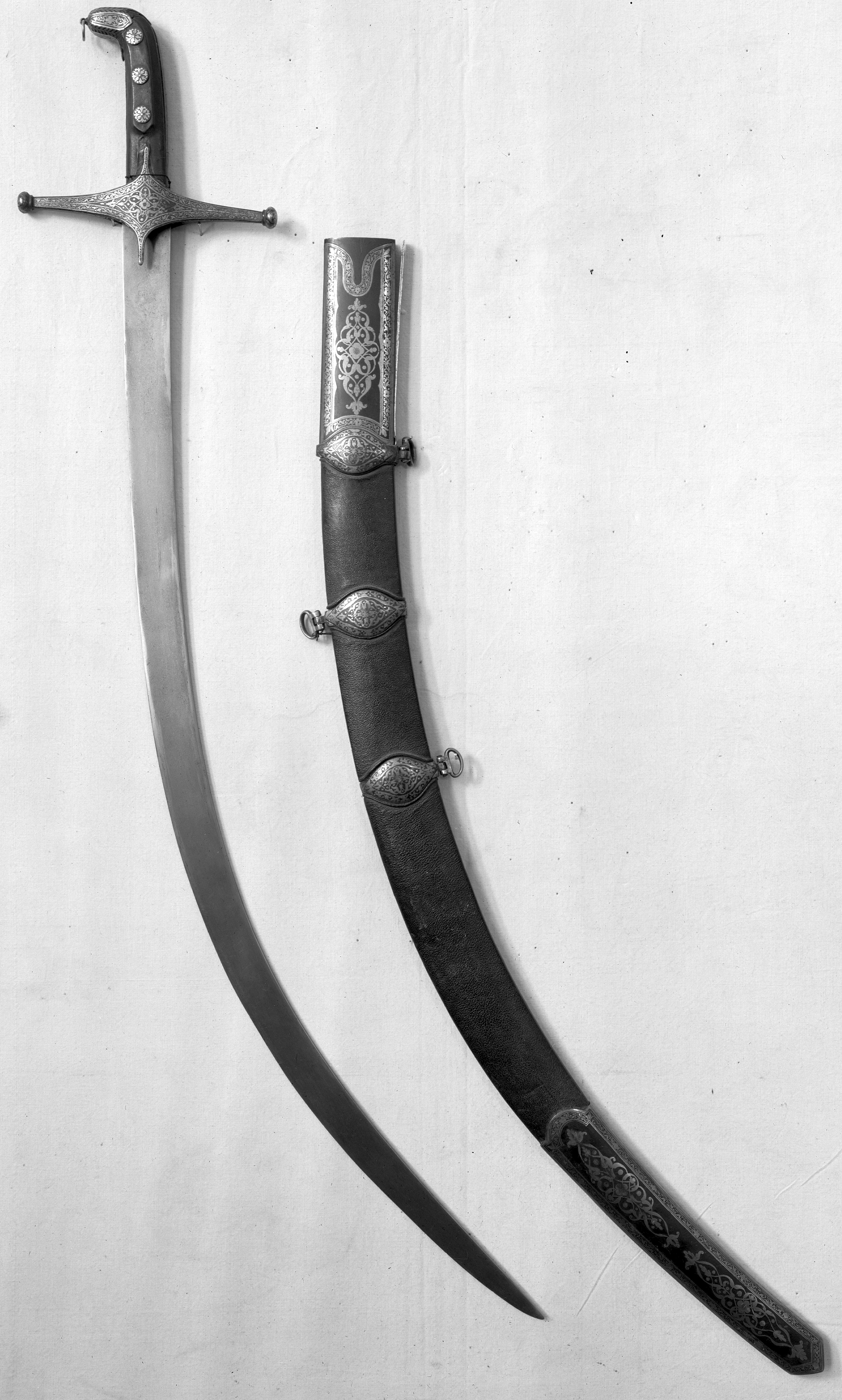
Persian shamshir. In addition to their flintlock muskets, Persian infantry were also equipped with shamshirs for close combat.

The infantry arm in the majority of Persian armies both in antiquity (Achaemenid, Arsacid, Sassanid) as well as modern history (Seljukid, Safavid) were considered a secondary force rather than an arm equal in importance to the cavalry. Additionally firearm infantry were never a fully developed corps in the Persian army with the exception of Shah Abbas the Great's reforms which did bring forth a modernised matchlock wielding body of soldiers into the Persian army.

The entire infantry corps had a standardised uniform of blue tunics and red trousers with a tall hat referred to as kolāh-e Nāderi, (کلاهِ نادری).

Nader's early campaigns against the Abdali Afghans of western Afghanistan which fielded superior cavalry compelled Nader to seek a tactical solution geared around an infantry solution. The development of this system of having strong firearm infantry to provide a stable pivot around which to position artillery and manoeuvre cavalry allowed Nader to defeat the Abdali horsemen.

=== Tofangchi ===
The Tofangchi (تفنگچی) were the regular musket armed infantry of the army and had been an increasingly large part of the Persian armies since the time of the Safavids. The Tofangchi also carried a melee weapon such as either a long dagger (Khanjar) or a curved Persian sword (shamshir). Generally the Tofangchi were equipped with lighter muskets than the elite Jazāyerchi.

=== Jazāyerchi ===
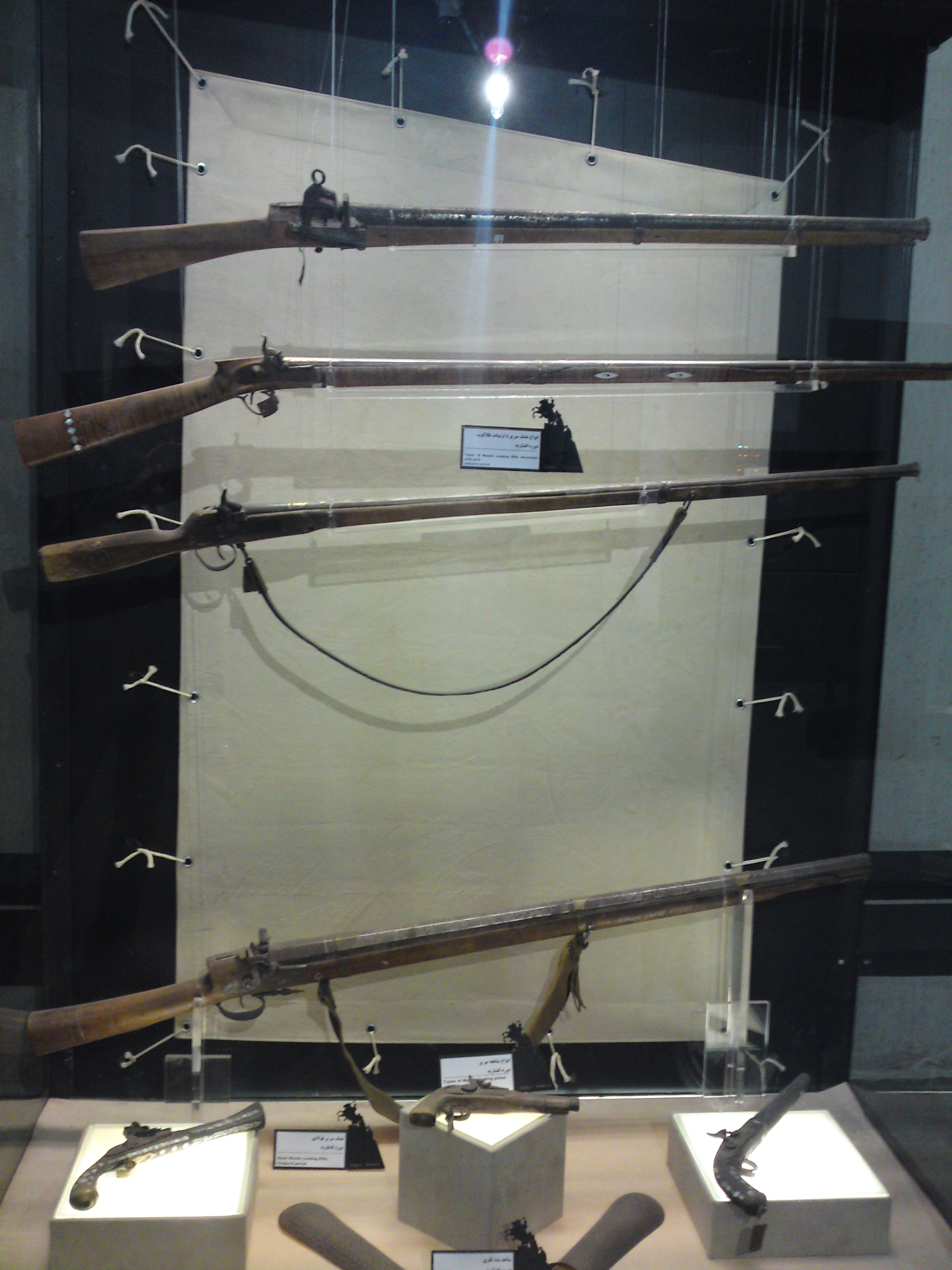
Jezayel muskets on display in Mashhad's Museum of Nader Shah.

The jazāyerchi (Persian: جزائلچی، جزائرچی) were the elite of Nader's infantry musketeers. The jazail (جزائل jazāyel), also called jazayer (جزائر), a flintlock musket, used by these infantrymen was of a much heavier calibre than their European counterparts and consequently had a greater range as well as improved accuracy (the average European musket weighed around 5 kilograms and fired a shot only 18 millimetres in diameter, whereas the jazail weighed almost 18 kilograms and fired a shot 24 millimetres in diameter).

Unlike European muskets however, the jezail was loaded using a horn rather than a paper cartridge meaning although the jezail had the advantages of range, force of impact and accuracy, it took longer to reload than the standard European muskets of the era. One of the earliest recordings of Persian soldiers using jezails in combat dates back to the mid-seventeenth century. In addition to the jezail, jazāyerchi also used shamshirs. This body of infantry underwent an incredibly intense regiment of drills and continuous training. An eyewitness account of one of the training sessions gives the following description:

[T]he infantry—I mean those that carried muskets—would get together in their own units and they would shoot their guns at a target and exercise continuously. If Tahmasp Quli Khan, (referring here to Nader), saw an ordinary soldier consistently on top form he would promote him to be a leader of 100 men or a leader of 50 men. He encouraged all the soldiers toward bravery, ability and experience, and in simple words he himself gave an example of strong character and military virtue.

Jazāyerchi units engaged in training several hours every day. A clear emphasis was given to constant drilling of the soldiers. Nader shaped the jazāyerchi corps himself and often took personal command of them in battle. According to another contemporary, the jazāyerchi were well uniformed and provided with the best equipment.

The total number of jazāyerchi seems to have varied with time as we have varying reports of strength numbers but generally speaking the corps was approximately a dozen thousand strong. Jonas Hanway reported that in 1744 there was a contingent of 12,000 jazāyerchi in addition to the 40,000 regular Tofangchi (musketeers). Nader also had a contingent of 12,000 jazāyerchi on his Central Asian campaign.

Although the Jazāyerchi were an infantry corps they usually campaigned on mounts and occasionally fought as mounted troops also, (as some units did at Karnal). They were used to achieve the hardest and most crucial tactical tasks due to their high quality as elite fighting troops, proving their worth in many battles including Mihmandust, Murche-Khort, Kirkuk, Yeghevārd, Karnal and Kars.

On the deadly impact of the jezail during the Battle of Karnal, a contemporary noted, "An arrow cannot answer a Jezail".

== Cavalry ==
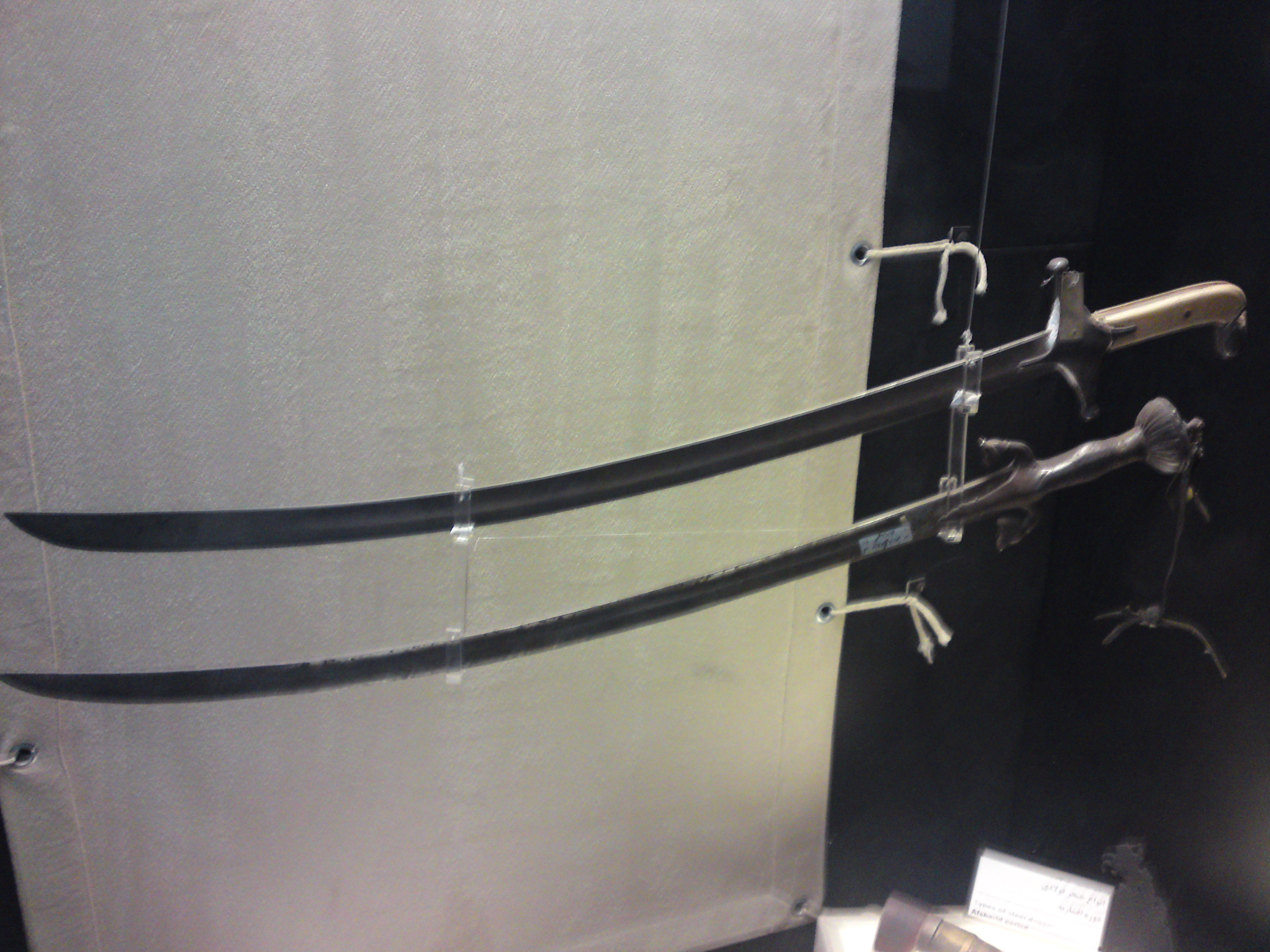
Shamshirs (swords) from the Afsharid era, displayed at Nader Shah's Museum in Mashhad.

The cavalry held the most esteemed position in the Iranian armies from the very beginnings of Iranian Empires well over 2,500 years ago. Nader introduced far reaching reforms in this arm of the military including the State's financial responsibility for the cavalrymen's mounts. Prior to Nader, horsemen would be unwilling to cause much risk for their steeds as they were usually a prized property of their master's. The cavalry corps were fundamentally divided into two groups by their origin (whether they were recruited by the central government or pressed into service from subject lands and from tributary clans).

Persian cavalry were in general superior to their Ottoman counterparts.

...they attacked from all sides, circling in any new direction. The ranks closed in and then they would charge and then disperse, after which this same scattered group would close ranks on the same point. They would feign a retreat and then counter attack...

— Vatatzes, Basile

Although the majority of the cavalry were armed with shamshirs a number of other weapons such as lances and firearms were also used. By 1736 muskets were one of the standard weapons of the cavalry, enabling the troops further flexibility in both scouting and skirmishing (as witnessed at Karnal).

=== Iranian cavalry ===
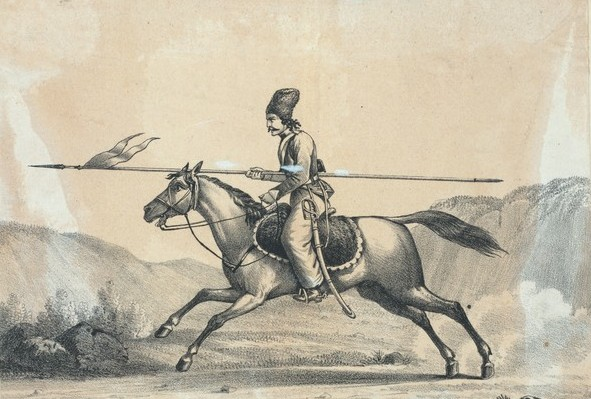
A lightly armoured Persian Lancer

The most prestigious cavalry units belonging to the State were the Shah's personal guard. One of the most illustrious units was Savaran-e Saltanati (سواران‌ سلطنتی). The title of the unit can be translated as the "Royal Cavalry". The Afsharid, Jalayerid, Qajarid clans were used as the main pools of recruitment as well as the Shahsevan of Azerbaijan, and Iranian tribes of Western Iran. The Savaran-e Sepah-e Khorasan (سواران‌ سپاه خراسان) consisted of 20 fowj (each fowj being a regiment of 1,000 soldiers) giving a total of 20,000 horsemen.

The Gholāmān-e Shāh (غلامان شاه, literally meaning "Servants of the Shah") was a unit of 3,000 chosen cavalrymen which functioned as Nader's personal guard.

=== Auxiliary cavalry ===
Another prestigious division in Nader's forces was the Savaran-e Sepah-e Khorasan (سواران‌ سپاه خراسان), which can be translated as the "Riders of the Army of Khorasan". Drawn primarily from the Gilzai, Abdali, Kurds and other tribal elements in the Empire. The Afghan horsemen (both Gilzai & Abdali) were among the very finest of shock cavalry in Asia. The size of this cavalry body fluctuated with time but at one point it was reported as 70,000 strong. Elements within the Savaran-e Sepah-e Khorasan were occasionally promoted by Nader to the Savaran-e Saltanati (سواران سلطنتی). The Savaran-e Sepah-e Khorasan played a decisive role in the final phase of the battle of Kars in which they participated in a huge flank attack, (40,000 strong), which Nader led personally.

== Artillery ==
One of the branches of service to benefit most from Nader's reforms was by far the artillery. During the reign of the Safavid dynasty gunpowder weapons were used to a relatively limited extent and were certainly not to be considered central to the Safavid military machine. Although most of Nader's military campaigns were conducted with an aggressive speed of advance which brought up difficulties in keeping up the heavy guns with the army's rapid marches, Nader placed great emphasis on enhancing his artillery units.

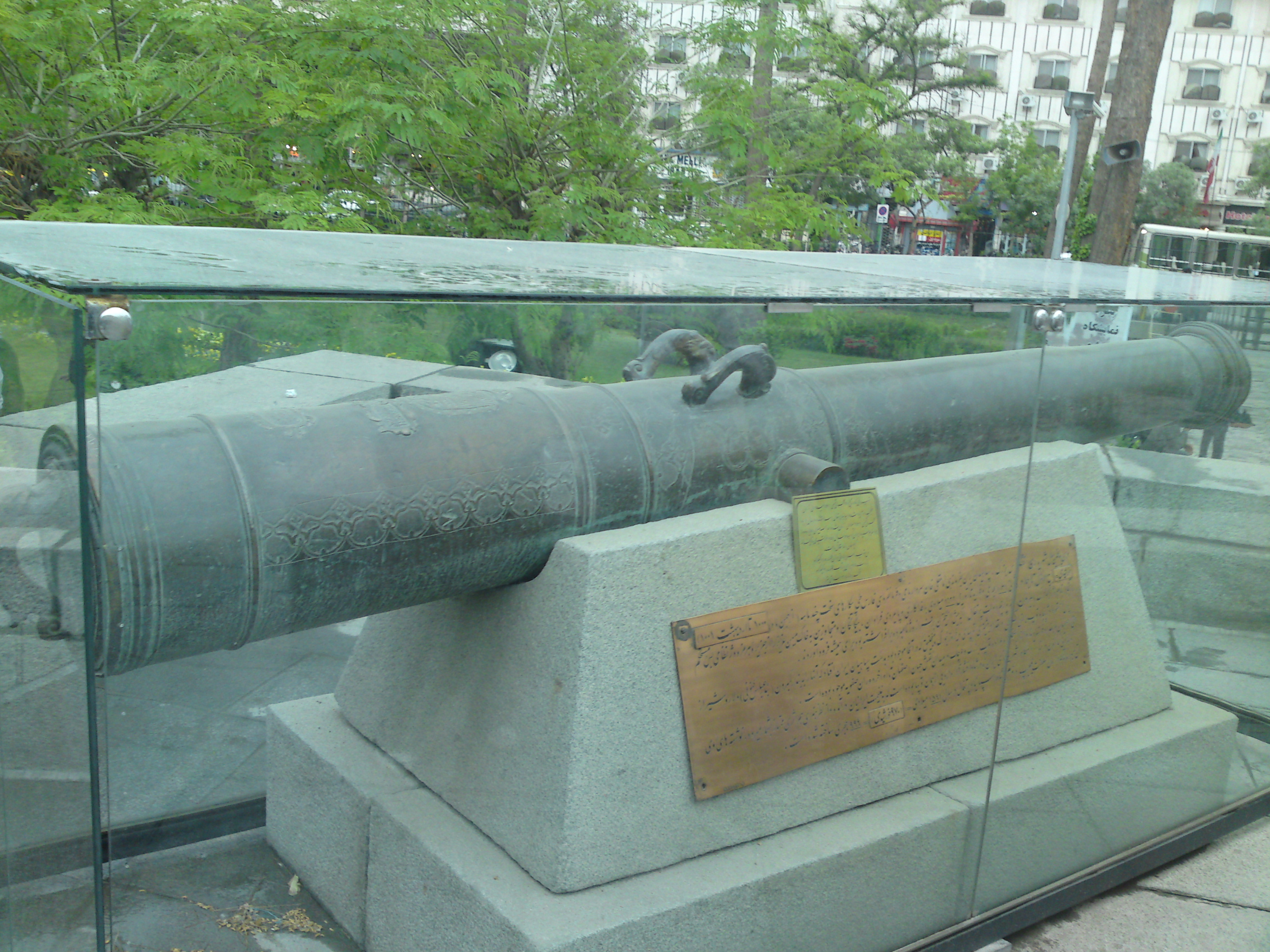
A field cannon from the Afsharid period.

The main centres of Persian armament production were Amol, Kermanshah, Isfahan, Merv. These military factories achieved high levels of production and managed to equip the army with good quality cannon. However mobile workshops allowed for Nader to maintain his strategic mobility whilst preserving versatility in the deployment of heavy siege cannon when required.

One of Nader's key artillery units were the zamburakchi (زنبورکچی), a corps of artillery batteries which were 1 or 2-pounder swivel guns mounted on the back of camels. They were rather inaccurate and short in range compared to regular field-artillery but had the clear advantage in mobility and when massed could deliver a devastating volley (as seen in the battles of Yeghevard and Karnal). The Persian army maintained a corps of many hundreds of zamburaks.

The field artillery became an integral part of Nader's forces. During Nader's first Mesopotamian campaign, the field army he marched north to Samarra to confront the relief force commanded by Topal Pasha contained eighteen field pieces (four 30-pounders, six 15-pounders and another six 9-pounders).

Benefiting from Nader's reforms, the Persian field artillery became superior to both the Ottoman and in particular the Mughal artillery. In the battles of Yeghevard and Kars the Persian guns fired more accurately and attained a significantly higher rate of fire than their Turkish counterparts. Persian artillery was also very effective in Nader's Central Asian Campaign as the warriors of the Central Asian Khanate were unfamiliar with engaging armies with modernised artillery and gunpowder.

== See also ==
- Nader Shah
- Afsharid dynasty
- Military history of Iran
