= Battle of Damghan (1729) =

Battle near the city of Damghan, Iran (1729)

- Part of Nader's Campaigns
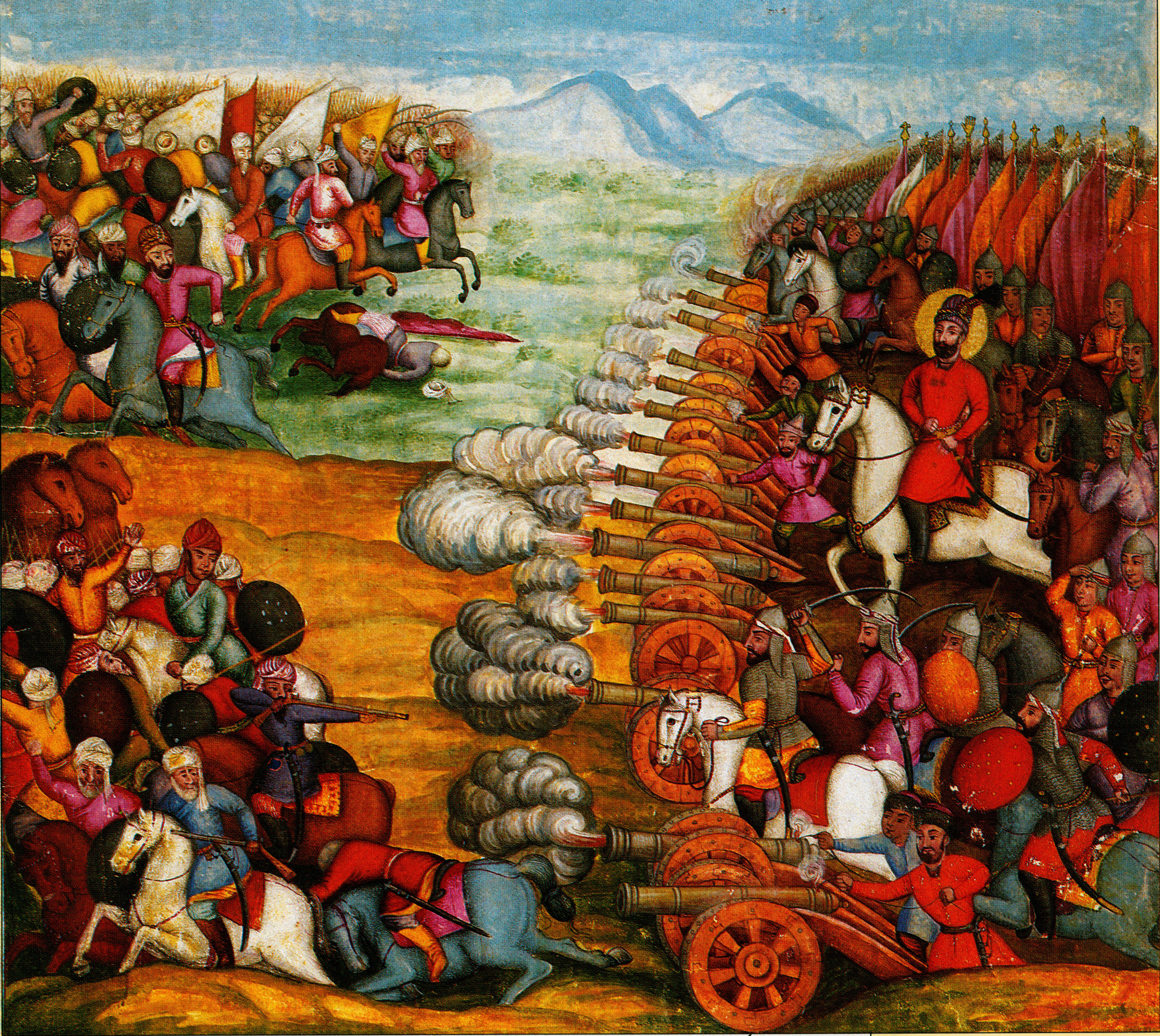
- Painting of Battle of Damghan, illustrating Persian decisive artillery fire against the Afghans.
Date	29 September – 5 October 1729
Location	Mihmandoost near Damghan 36°15′N 54°42′E
Result	Safavid victory
Territorial changes	The Hotak dynasty lost territory in Persia

Belligerents
Safavid Empire	Hotak Emirate

Commanders and leaders
Nader; Lotf Ali Khan; Tahmasp Khan Jalayer; Fath Ali Khan Kayani; Latif Khan	Ashraf Hotak; Mohammad Seidal; Nasrullah Khan; Zebardust Khan

Strength
16,000	25,000–50,000 or 30,000

Casualties and losses
3,000 or 4,000	10,000-12,000 killed

The Battle of Damghan (Persian: نبرد دامغان) or Battle of Mehmandoost (Persian: نبرد مهماندوست) was fought on 29 September to 5 October 1729, near the city of Damghan. It resulted in an overwhelming victory for Nader and the Safavid cause he had taken up. Although it by itself did not end Ashraf's rule in Iran, it was a significant triumph which led to further successes in the following engagements of the campaign to restore Tahmasp II to the throne. The battle was followed by another one in Murcheh-Khort, a village near Isfahan. Nader's forces were victorious in both battles, which led him to remove the Ghilzai Afghan dynasty from their short stay on the Persian throne. The Hotakis were forced back to their territory in what is now southern Afghanistan.

The Battle of Damghan proved the supremacy of Nader's artillery-dependent military system compared to the old, exclusively cavalry-based system utilised by the Afghans. Despite losing this battle, Hotak tried to come back in the Battle of Murcheh-Khort, relying on guns and artillerymen from the Ottomans. But in the Battle of Murcheh-Khort Ashraf Hotak lost to the superior army of Nader. Hotak was killed in 1730, and Nader succeeded in overthrowing the Hotak dynasty in 1738.

== Background ==
Ashraf having come to power in the aftermath of a coup against his predecessor, Mahmud Hotak, had achieved great success in the war with the Ottomans where with a much inferior force he overcame a superior Turkish army and agreed to a settlement which divided the west of the former Safavid Empire of Iran with his Ottoman adversary in the aftermath of which he secured Turkish support and acceptance as the legitimate ruler of Iran.

Meanwhile, Nader and Tahmasp had been campaigning in the north-east, building up a base from which to challenge Ashraf's claim on his newly acquired dominion. Hearing of Nader's march on Herat, Ashraf set out from Isfahan in August 1729 with a host of 30,000 strong, in the hope of conquering Khorasan while Nader was waging war on the Abdali Afghans further to the east. Unfortunately for Ashraf, Nader subjugated Herat and returned to Mashad before Ashraf could invade Khorasan. Upon hearing of Ashraf's approach, Nader gathered his fighting men to set out via Sabzevar on 12 September 1729.

By the time Ashraf reached and besieged Semnan his force had grown to 40,000 compared to Nader's estimated strength of 25,000. Leaving a token force behind to resume the siege of Semnan Ashraf marched east towards Shahroud sending a fraction of his command ahead to seek out and destroy Nader's artillery. The first clash of arms between the two side occurred in a small but savagely fought skirmish south-east of Shahroud in which 14 Afghans were made prisoners whom were taken to Nader for interrogation. Nader continued to press forward until dusk, whence he began to make camp east of an obscure village by the name of Mehmandust. That night Tahmasp promised him his sister's hand in marriage if Nader gained victory in battle on the following day.

== Battle ==
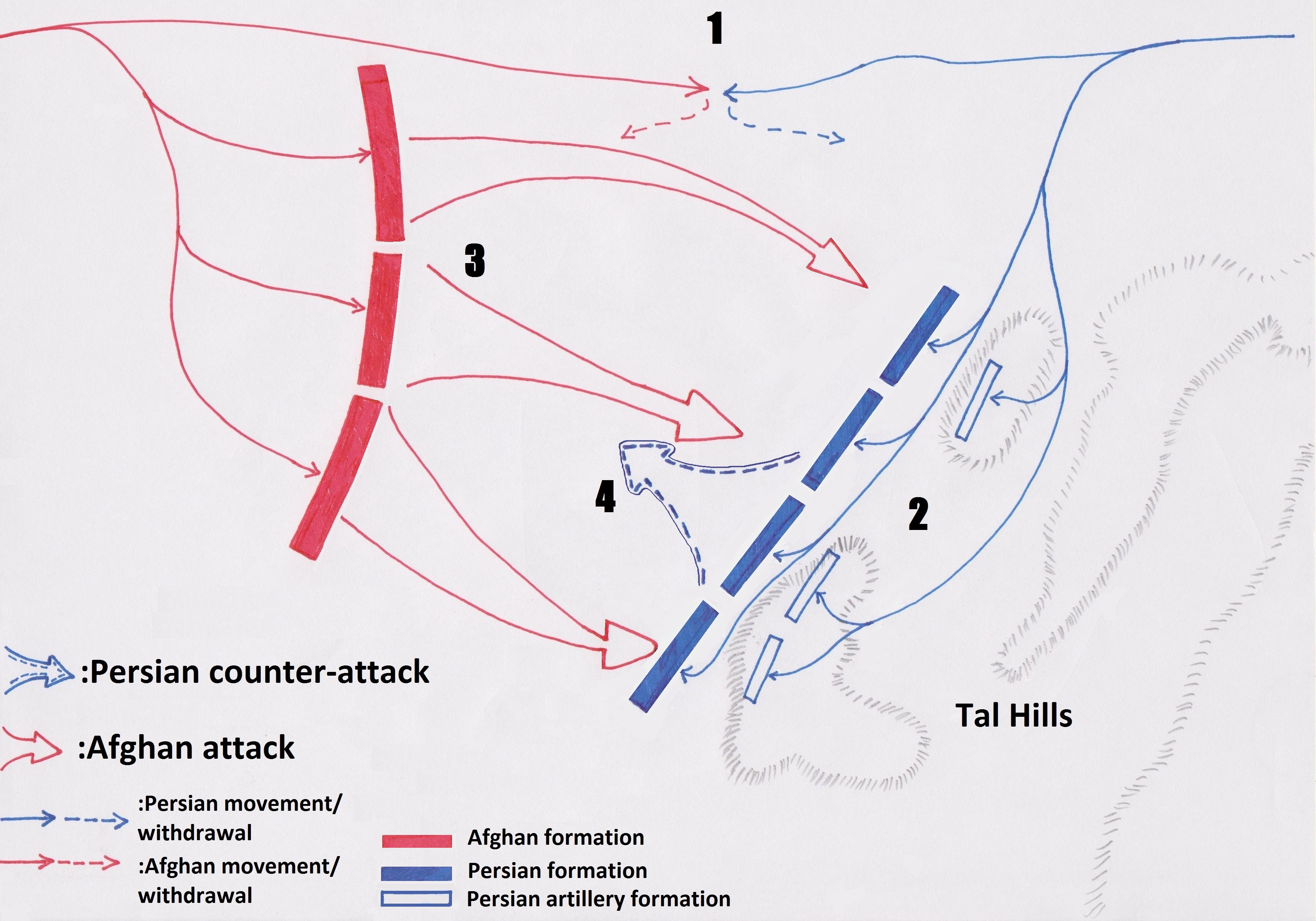
1. Nader sends forth his rear guard to protect his deployment on the left, onto the Tal hills. Elements of the Afghan left come into contact with the Persian rear guard but both sides soon break off to rejoin their respective armies; 2. Nader uses this time to place his artillery on high ground overlooking his line infantry; 3. Ashraf orders an all-out charge but his army is shattered by Persian musketry and cannon fire at close range; 4. Nader gathers an infantry body and makes a thrust right into the heart of the Afghan army dividing it in two and routing it off the field

=== Deployments and pre-engagement manoeuvres ===
In the morning of 29 September, Ashraf drew up his army in the traditional fashion in three separate formations making up the centre, left and right as opposed to the Persian army which Nader had formed up in four divisions. Ashraf was so confident of victory that he set aside two to three thousand of his horsemen to hunt down and capture Tahmasp and Nader after his victory.

A rearguard of a few thousand mounted troops covered Nader's ongoing deployment to the left, on the Tal hills. In a break with conventional deployment patterns in oriental armies of this period Nader placed his artillery pieces behind his line infantry, where from their elevated positions on the high ground they overlooked the compact formations of Persian Jazāyerchi (musketeers) at the base of the hills as well as the valley in front of them. The Afghan left which had come into contact with the Persian rearguard and instead of pursuing them fell back in line with the rest of Ashraf's army when the rearguard was withdrawn. Ashraf gave the order for an all out charge driving his cavalry army of 40,000 riders towards the Persians whom were now awaiting at the foot of the Tal hills. The terrifying horde of Afghan riders charged forward with incredible speed and impetus.

=== The Afghan charge is broken up ===
A harrowing roar of cannon fire echoed throughout the valley as the Persian guns atop the crest of the hills were submerged under a white cloud of billowing smoke causing "three or four hundred Afghan soldiers to be sliced through like cucumbers". As the flanks of the Afghan army came into range of the Jazāyerchi they were shot to pieces as the Persian officers withheld their infantry's first volley until they could make out their enemies faces from the crowd, (perhaps a distance of a few dozen metres). This particular measure which had been perfected over the course of many years and battles by Nader's veteran Jazāyerchi proved devastatingly effective. The momentum of the Afghan charge had been sapped with the rear ranks falling over and trampling the remains of their shattered comrades in a staggered advance giving way to a terrible confusion with dust and smoke all around, incessant volleys from Persian musketeers, cannonballs striking punching through the flesh of man and beast alike as the zamburaks having found Ashraf's men within their range brought their swivel guns to bear. In amidst this bloody chaos Ashraf's chief standard holder was struck by a cannonball and a few of his own horses also perished under the unrelenting bombardment of Persian artillery fire which also succeeded in all but laying waste to the Afghan artillery (mostly consisting of zamburaks that were notoriously vulnerable to conventional cannon fire due to being mounted on camels making them easy targets for greater calibre guns).

=== Nader's thrust through the centre ===
A Persian counter-attack materialised in the form of a grouping of Jazāyerchi pressing forward with sabres drawn into the centre of Ashraf's army where the remains of his artillery were positioned. In the ensuing melee that developed the Jazāyerchi (who were armed with swords as well as other weaponry for hand-to-hand fighting) succeeded in pushing through the nucleus of their opponents formation and therefore in effect bisecting Ashraf's army, obliging it to flee the field having been completely bloodied. A short pursuit of the enemy followed by a contingent of Afshars that Nader had held in reserve but only for a few kilometres and the bulk of the Persian army were not allowed to join in the short lived hunt as Nader suspected a possible ambush further ahead en route to Semnan.

== Aftermath ==
Leaving behind 12,000 dead, Ashraf marched hastily westward in a frantic bid to make good his losses in time for a subsequent confrontation. He wagered on an ambush which he set up around Khwar pass. Meanwhile, Nader and Tahmasp fell out over what course of action to take in the aftermath of Mehmandust, as Nader (possibly disingenuously) advocated a return to Mashhad to re-consolidate, to Tahmasp's extreme chagrin. In fact Tahmasp was so disconcerted by Nader's foot dragging that he marched out of camp in protest, prompting Nader to send reconciliatory emissaries inviting the shah to return to the army although Nader would leave him at Tehran before resuming the campaign any further.

== See also ==
- Military of Afsharid Iran
- Battle of Gulnabad
- Battle of Murche-Khort
- Battle of Khwar Pass
