= Ashraf Hotak =

Hotak emir of Afghanistan (died 1730)

Shah Ashraf Hotak
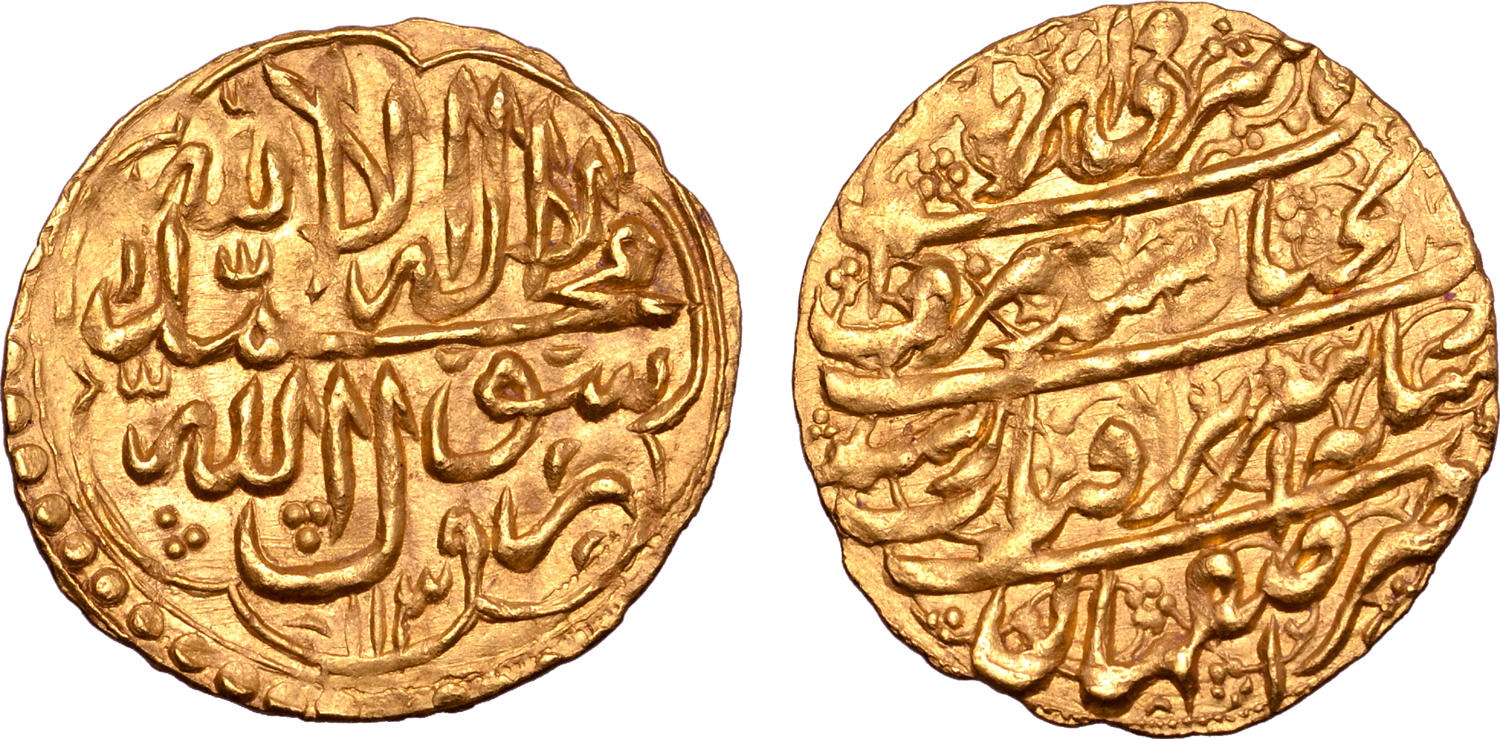
- Coin of Ashraf, Isfahan mint, 1725–29

Shah of Iran
- Reign: 22 April 1725 – 5 October 1729
- Coronation: 22 April 1725, Isfahan
- Predecessor: Mahmud Hotak
- Successor: Tahmasp II
- Born: c. 1700; Kandahar Province, Safavid Iran
- Died: c. 1730; Balochistan
- Dynasty: Hotak
- Father: Abdul Aziz Hotak
- Religion: Sunni Islam

Shah Ashraf Hotak (Pashto/Persian: شاه اشرف هوتک; died 1730), also known as Shah Ashraf Ghilji or Ghilzay (شاه اشرف غلجي), was an Afghan ruler who reigned as Shah of Iran from 1725 to 1729.

He was a member of the Hotak tribe of the Ghilji Pashtuns, who revolted against the declining Safavid dynasty of Iran and conquered the capital Isfahan in 1722. He was the son of Abdul Aziz Hotak and a nephew of Mirwais Hotak. He served as a commander in the army of his cousin Mahmud Hotak during the revolt against the Safavids. Ashraf also participated in the Battle of Gulnabad. In 1725, he killed his cousin and reigned as Shah of Iran until 1729. His reign was noted for the sudden decline in the Hotak tribal rule under increasing pressure from Ottoman, Russian, and Persian forces.

Ashraf Khan halted both the Russian and Ottoman onslaughts. In the Ottoman–Hotaki War, he defeated the Ottoman Empire, which wanted to restore the Safavids to the throne, in a battle near Kermanshah. A peace agreement was finally signed in October 1727, in which Ashraf was recognized as Shah.

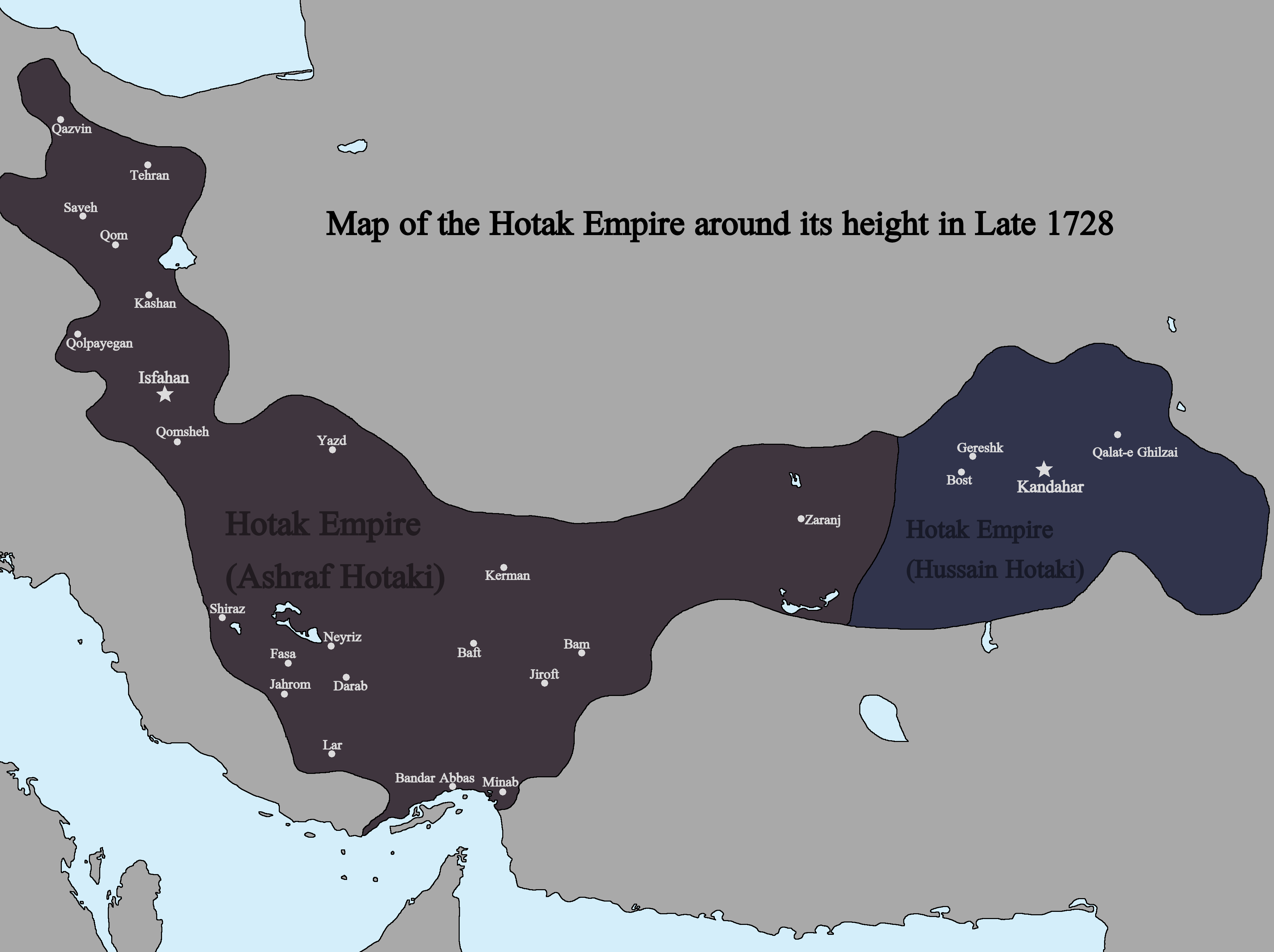
Map of the Hotaki Empire during Shah Ashraf's reign

Ultimately, the royal Persian army of Shah Tahmasp II (one of the Shah Sultan Husayn's sons) under the leadership of Nader decisively defeated Ashraf's forces at the Battle of Damghan in October 1729 again at Murche-Khort the next year, causing the collapse of the Afghan army. Ashraf was killed on the way back to Kandahar, possibly on the orders of his cousin Hussain Hotak.

== Biography ==
Ashraf was born in southern Afghanistan in the early 18th century into a prominent family of the Hotak tribe, which led the Ghilji (or Ghilzay) Pashtun confederacy along with the Tokhi tribe. He was the oldest son of Abdul Aziz Hotak and a nephew of Mirwais Hotak; the latter was a mayor of Kandahar who revolted against the Safavids in 1709 and remained an independent ruler until 1715. Ashraf participated in the invasion of Iran by the Ghilji in 1721–1722, which resulted in the siege and capture of the Safavid capital of Isfahan in 1722. The Safavid shah Soltan Hoseyn was overthrown and replaced by Ashraf's cousin, Mahmud, with whom Ashraf had poor relations. After this, Ashraf returned to Kandahar and remained there for a few years. In the meantime, Mahmud faced difficulties as ruler and grew increasingly unstable. His attitude towards Ashraf worsened, and the latter appeared to become more popular as Mahmud's position weakened. Ashraf was convinced by his companions that he would be a better king than Mahmud. He returned to Isfahan and began plotting against his cousin. Mahmud had Ashraf imprisoned, but on 22 April 1725 part of the Afghan army freed Ashraf and overthrew Mahmud, who was probably murdered shortly afterwards. Ashraf was crowned as Shah of Iran on 26 April 1725. After taking power, Ashraf eliminated a number of potential threats to his rule. He blinded his own brother and executed most of the leaders of the coup which had placed him on the throne. He also married a daughter of the deposed Soltan Hoseyn. Historian Michael Axworthy writes that Ashraf was "as brutal and ruthless as Mahmud, but more calculating, less impulsive, and less prone to self-doubt."

Ashraf spent most of his four-year-long reign in conflict with internal and external enemies. He sought to recover the territories which had recently been conquered by the Ottoman and Russian empires in the north and northwest of Iran. He initially attempted to come to a peaceful settlement with the Ottoman Empire and sent an embassy there in October 1725. He asked the Ottomans to acknowledge him as a legitimate and independent Sunni ruler. He argued that the Afghans had taken control of Iran as "unclaimed" territory, and that because Istanbul and Isfahan were located in non-contiguous regions, Iran need not be subordinated to the Ottomans. Ashraf's appeal was rebuffed by the Ottoman sultan Ahmed III, who ordered a campaign against the Afghans in the spring of 1726. After the Ottoman commander Ahmed Pasha sent a letter to Ashraf stating his intention to restore the legitimate Iranian ruler, Ashraf ordered the execution of Soltan Hoseyn. The Afghan and Ottoman armies met at Khorramabad in November 1726. The Afghans damaged Ottoman morale by sending infiltrators who emphasized the common Sunni faith of the two sides. The Afghans emerged victorious, and a peace agreement was reached in October 1727 (but not ratified) which allowed the Ottomans to keep the Iranian lands they had occupied while recognizing Ashraf's rule. Ashraf then confronted the Russians. Although he suffered a defeat close to Langarud in 1727, he signed a treaty with the Russians at Rasht in February 1729 which further strengthened his legitimacy.

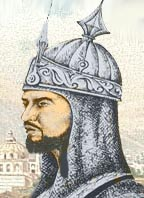
Modern depiction of Ashraf

Ashraf's struggle against the foreign invaders gained him some supporters among the Iranian population, especially among Sunni Kurds and Zoroastrians but also members of the Shi'ite Shahsevan tribe. However, most of the population still would not accept Afghan rule, and a number of rebellions broke out which weakened the government. Additionally, the Afghans themselves suffered from internal divisions. Ashraf could not count on the support of the Ghilji chiefs in Kandahar, who had supported his cousin Mahmud and were displeased with his overthrow. Several individuals claiming Safavid descent raised rebellions in different parts of the country. After the defeat and death of these pretenders, only Tahmasp, Soltan Hoseyn's only living son who was sheltering in Mazandaran, was able to rally support and pose a serious threat to Ashraf's role. Tahmasp gained the support of many chiefs from the Qajar and Afshar tribes, two powerful Turkic tribes in the northeast of Iran. His most important military support came from Nader Qoli Beg Afshar (later Nader Shah). Tahmasp's forces captured Mashhad in November 1726 and eventually took control of all of northeastern Iran, whence they planned to take control of the throne.

Ashraf sent a force against Tahmasp, which was defeated by Nader at Mehmandust near Damghan on 29 September 1729. Nader followed up on this victory and went on the offensive, forcing Ashraf to withdraw from his base in Tehran to Isfahan. In order to deter a pro-Safavid uprising in Isfahan, Afghan forces plundered the city and massacred part of its population. Apparently having received support from the Ottomans, Ashraf's army faced Nader's at Murche-Khort, 35 miles (56 km) northwest of Isfahan. The Afghans took large casualties in the fierce fighting, and Ashraf fled Isfahan on 13 November 1729, three days before Nader entered the city. Even after this defeat, however, Ashraf had an army of around 20,000. Nader chased after Ashraf and defeated his forces again at Zarqan and Pol-e Fasa, causing the collapse of the Afghan army. After a failed attempt to reach Ottoman Basra by sea, he made his way towards Kandahar through inland Iran. Near the border of Sistan, he was attacked by a group of Baluchis and killed in early 1730. The Baluchis may have been sent by Hussain, Ashraf's cousin, to avenge the killing of Mahmud. According to another account, Hussain sent his own son Ibrahim after Ashraf after the latter reached Kandahar province. Ibrahim's men found Ashraf in a small village and chased after him on horseback. Ashraf stabbed Ibrahim in the side with a dagger, but Ibrahim was able to shoot Ashraf dead.

Ashraf Hotak Hotak dynasty Born: c. 1700 Died: c. 1730
Preceded by Mahmud Hotak	Shah of Persia; 1725–1729	Succeeded by Tahmasp II
Preceded by Mahmud Hotak	Emir of Afghanistan; 1725–1730	Succeeded by Hussain Hotak
