= Tahmasp II =

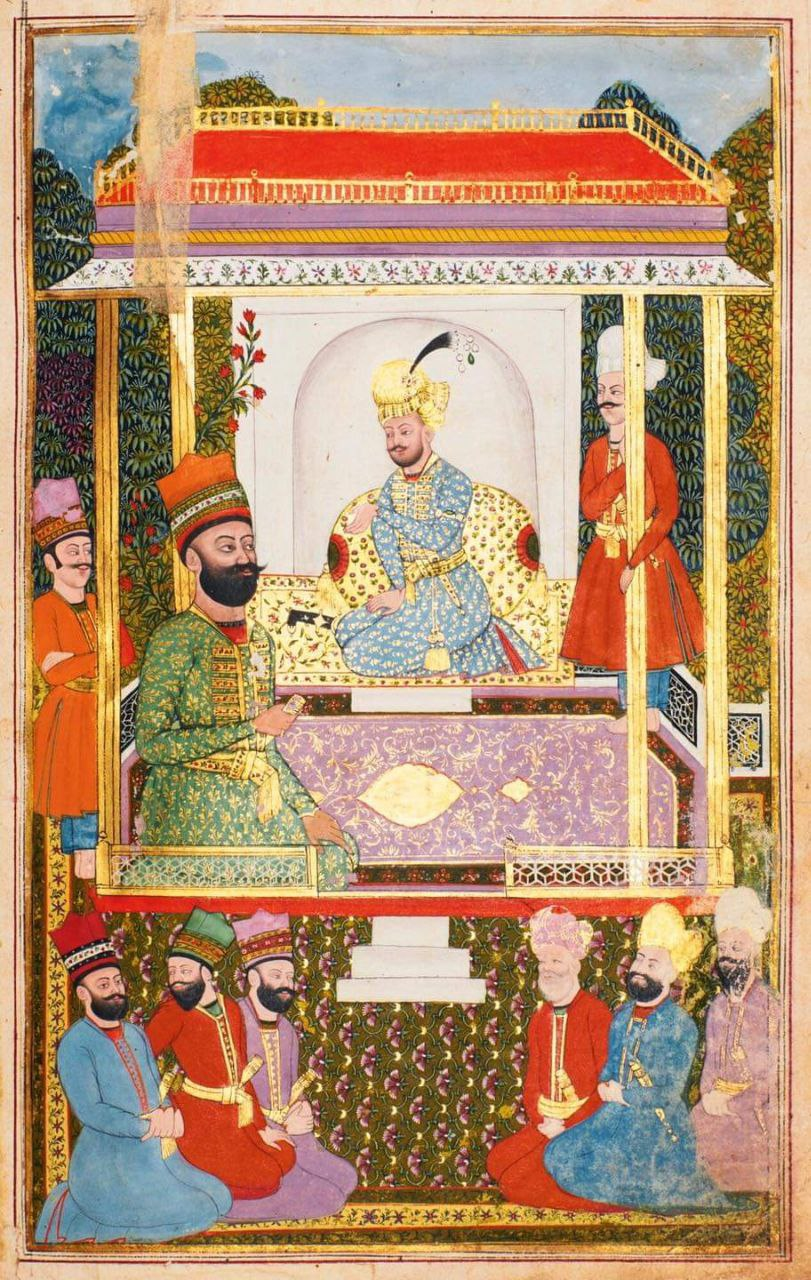
- Court scene with Tahmasp II in the centre, and Nader to his left. From a illustrated Indian copy of the Jahangosha-ye Naderi, dated 1757/58

Shah of Iran
- Reign: 10 November 1722 – 16 April 1732
- Predecessor: Soltan Hoseyn (Qazvin); Ashraf Hotak (Isfahan)
- Successor: Abbas III
- Born: 1704; Isfahan, Safavid Iran
- Died: 11 February 1740 (aged 35–36); Sabzevar, Afsharid Iran
- Spouse: Shahpari Begum
- Issue: Abbas III; Hossein; Esmat-nesa begum
- Dynasty: Safavid
- Father: Soltan Hoseyn
- Religion: Shia Islam

Tahmasp II (Persian: شاه تهماسب دوم, romanized: Shāh Ṭahmāsb-e Dovom; 1704 – 11 February 1740) was the penultimate Safavid shah (king) of Iran, ruling from 1722 to 1732.

== Biography ==
=== Name ===
Tahmasp (Persian: طهماسب, romanized: Ṭahmāsb) is a New Persian name, ultimately derived from Old Iranian *ta(x)ma-aspa, meaning "having valiant horses." The name is one of the few instances of a name from the Shahnameh being used by an Islamic-era dynasty based in Iran. In the Shahnameh, Tahmasp is the father of Zaav, the penultimate shah of the Pishdadian dynasty.

=== Rule ===
Tahmasp was the son of Soltan Hoseyn, the shah of Iran at the time. When Soltan Hoseyn was forced to abdicate by the Afghans in 1722, Prince Tahmasp wished to claim the throne. From the besieged Safavid capital, Isfahan, he fled to Qazvin, where on 10 November 1722 he declared himself shah and assumed the regnal name of Tahmasp II. He gained the support of the Sunni Muslims of the Caucasus (even that of the previously rebellious Lezgins), as well as several Qizilbash tribes (including the Afshars, under the control of Iran's future ruler, Nader Shah).

=== Russo-Persian War ===
In June 1722, Peter the Great, the then tsar of the neighbouring Russian Empire, declared war on Safavid Iran in an attempt to expand Russian influence in the Caspian and Caucasus regions and to prevent its rival, the Ottoman Empire, from making territorial gains in the region at the expense of the declining Safavid state.

The Russian victory led to Safavid Iran's cession of its territories in the Caucasus and contemporary mainland northern Iran, comprising the cities of Derbent (southern Dagestan) and Baku and the surrounding lands, as well as the provinces of Gilan, Shirvan, Mazandaran, and Astarabad to Russia per the Treaty of Saint Petersburg (1723).

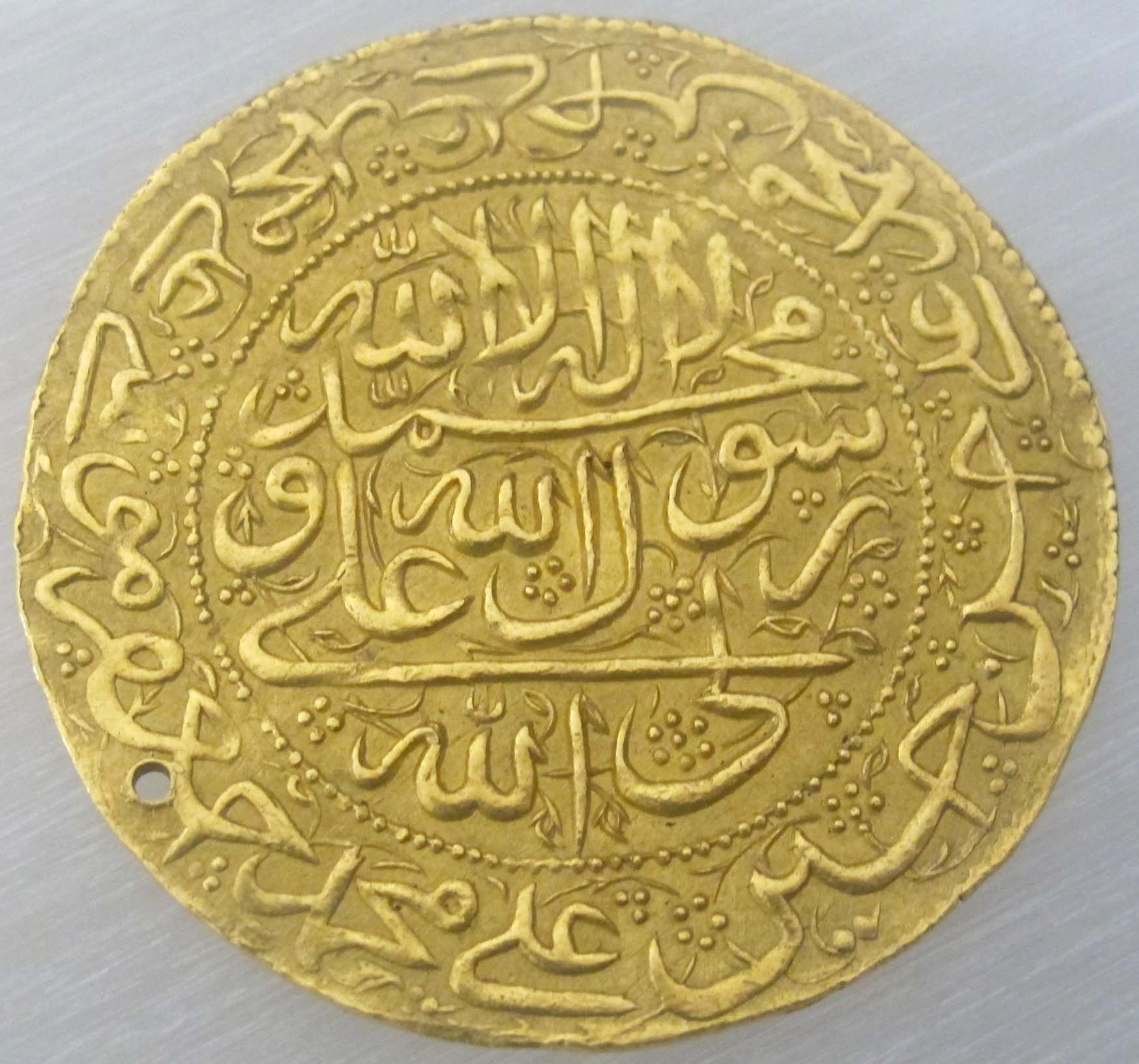
A gold coin of Shah Tahmasp II.

Tahmasp also eventually gained the recognition of both the Ottoman Empire and Russia, as each worried about the other gaining too much influence in Iran.

By 1729, Tahmasp had control of most of the country. Soon after his foolhardy Ottoman campaign of 1731, he was deposed by the future Nader Shah in 1732 in favor of his son, Abbas III; both were murdered at Sabzevar in 1740 by order of Nader Shah's eldest son, Reza Qoli Mirza.

== See also ==
- Tahmasp's campaign of 1731
- Ottoman–Persian War (1730–35)

== Sources ==
- Akopyan, Alexander V. (2021). "Coinage and the monetary system". In Matthee, Rudi (ed.). The Safavid World. Routledge. pp. 285–309.
- Ansari, Ali Mir (2012). The Politics of Nationalism in Modern Iran. Cambridge University Press. ISBN 978-0521687171.
- Newman, Andrew J. (2008). Safavid Iran: Rebirth of a Persian Empire. I.B.Tauris. pp. 1–281. ISBN 9780857716613.
- Hinz, Walther (1975). "Altiranisches Sprachgut der Nebenüberlieferungen". Göttinger Orientforschungen, Reihe III, Iranica (in German). 3. Wiesbaden: Otto Harrassowitz.
- Justi, Ferdinand (1895). Iranisches Namenbuch (in German). Marburg: N. G. Elwert’sche Verlagsbuchhandlung.
- Babaie, Sussan (2004). Slaves of the Shah: New Elites of Safavid Iran. I.B.Tauris. pp. 1–218. ISBN 9781860647215.
- Roemer, H.R. (1986). "The Safavid period". The Cambridge History of Iran, Volume 5: The Timurid and Safavid periods. Cambridge: Cambridge University Press. pp. 189–351. ISBN 9780521200943.
- Lawrence Lockhart, Nadir Shah (London, 1938)
- The Armenian Rebellion of the 1720s and the Threat of Genocidal Reprisal, Armen Ayvazyan, Yerevan 1997

Preceded by Soltan Hoseyn (Qazvin); Ashraf Hotak (Isfahan)	Shah of Iran; 10 November 1722 – 1732	Succeeded by Abbas III
