= Arch =

Curved structure that spans a space and may support a load

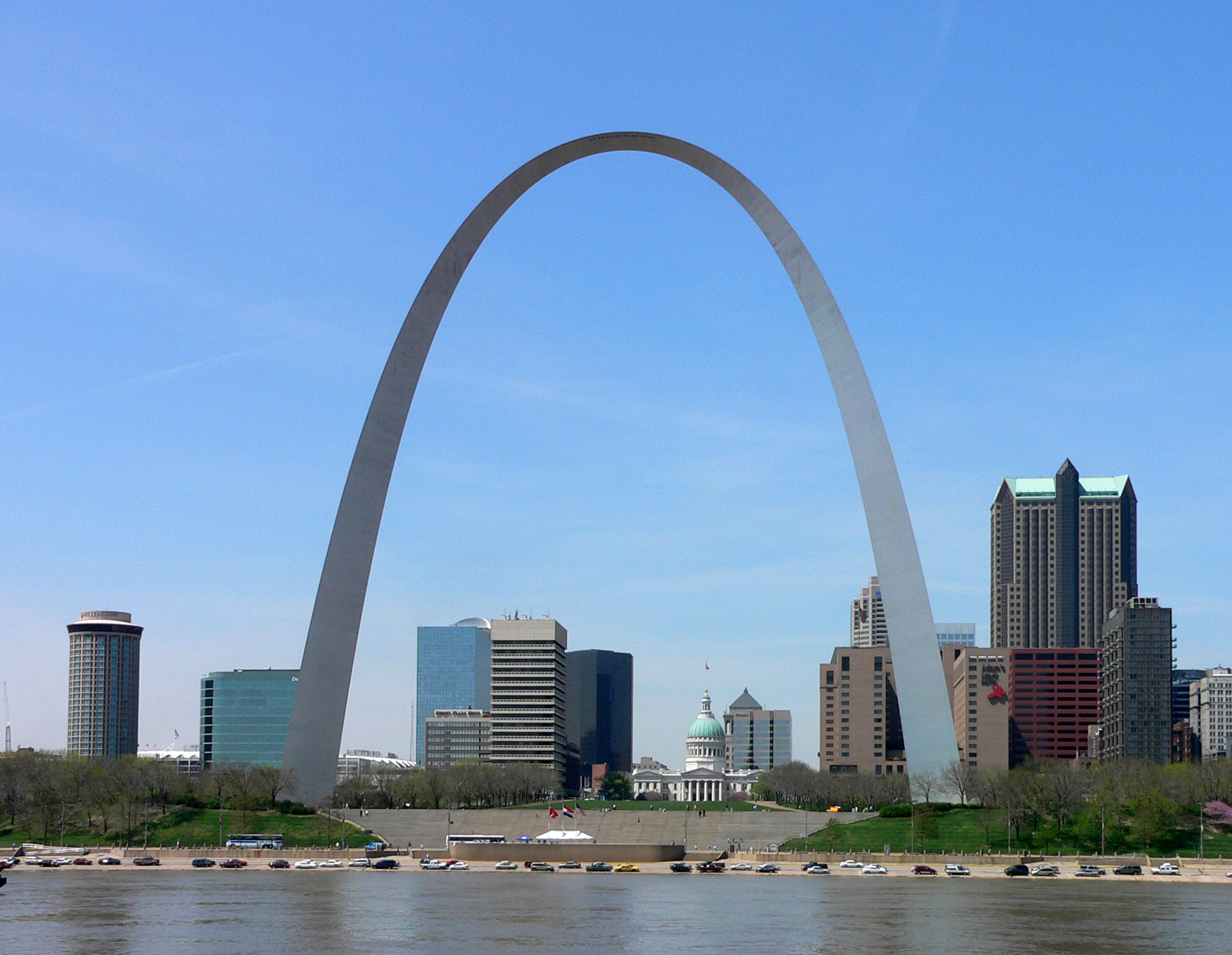
Gateway Arch

An arch is a curved vertical structure spanning an open space underneath it. Arches may support the load above them, or they may perform a purely decorative role. As a decorative element, the arch dates back to the 4th millennium BC, but structural load-bearing arches became popular only after their adoption by the Ancient Romans in the 4th century BC.

Arch-like structures can be horizontal, like an arch dam that withstands a horizontal hydrostatic pressure load. Arches are usually used as supports for many types of vaults, with the barrel vault in particular being a continuous arch. Extensive use of arches and vaults characterizes an arcuated construction, as opposed to the trabeated system, where, like in the architectures of ancient Greece, China, and Japan (as well as the modern steel-framed technique), posts and beams dominate.

The arch had several advantages over the lintel, especially in masonry construction: with the same amount of material an arch can have larger span, carry more weight, and can be made from smaller and thus more manageable pieces. Its role in construction was diminished in the middle of the 19th century with introduction of wrought iron (and later steel): the high tensile strength of these new materials made long lintels possible.

== Basic concepts ==
=== Terminology ===
A true arch is a load-bearing arch with elements operating under compressive forces. The term false arch has a few meanings. It is usually used to designate an arch that has no structural purpose, like a proscenium arch in theaters used to frame the performance for the spectators, but is also applied to corbelled and triangular arches that are not based on compression.

Masonry arch elements

A typical true masonry arch consists of the following elements:

1. Keystone, the top block in an arch. Portion of the arch around the keystone (including the keystone itself), with no precisely defined boundary, is called a crown
2. Voussoir (a wedge-like construction block). A compound arch is formed by multiple concentric layers of voussoirs. The rowlock arch is a particular case of the compound arch, where the voussoir faces are formed by the brick headers.
3. Extrados (an external surface of the arch)
4. Impost is a block at the base of the arch (the voussoir immediately above the impost is a springer). The springing line or springing level is where the arch begins to curve; it need not coincide with the top of the impost or capital. A portion of the arch between the springing level and the crown (centered around the 45° angle) is called a haunch. On a column, an arch can rest on the abacus; a dosseret provides an alternative in the form of a deep rectangular impost above the capital. Dosserets were common in Late Antique, Early Christian, and Byzantine architecture.
5. Intrados (an underside of the arch, also known as a soffit)
6. Rise (height of the arc, distance from the springing level to the crown)
7. Clear span
8. Abutment The roughly triangular-shaped portion of the wall between the extrados and the horizontal division above is called spandrel.

The thickness of an arch is measured between its intrados and extrados and may vary along the curve. Dividing the rise by the span gives its rise-to-span ratio.

A (left or right) half-segment of an arch is called an arc, the overall line of an arch is arcature (this term is also used for an arcade). Archivolt is the exposed (front-facing) part of the arch, sometimes decorated (occasionally also used to designate the intrados). If the sides of voussoir blocks are not straight, but include angles and curves for interlocking, the arch is called "joggled". Alternating colours of stone can emphasize the interlocking pattern. Joggled arches are common in Islamic architecture, including at the Bab al-Nasr in Cairo (1087).

=== Arch action ===
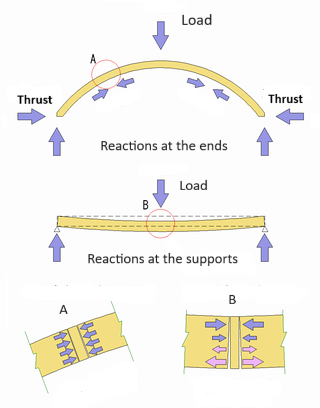
Arch (A) action diagram in comparison with a beam (B)

A true arch, due to its rise, resolves the vertical loads into horizontal and vertical reactions at the ends, a so called arch action. The vertical load produces a positive bending moment in the arch, while the inward-directed horizontal reaction from the spandrel/abutment provides a counterbalancing negative moment. As a result, the bending moment in any segment of the arch is much smaller than in a beam with the equivalent load and span. The diagram on the right shows the difference between a loaded arch and a beam. Elements of the arch are mostly subject to compression (A), while in the beam a bending moment is present, with compression at the top and tension at the bottom (B).

In the past, when arches were made of masonry pieces, the horizontal forces at the ends of an arch (so called thrust) caused the need for heavy abutments (cf. Roman triumphal arch). The other way to counteract the forces, and thus allow thinner supports, was to use the counter-arches, as in an arcade arrangement, where the horizontal thrust of each arch is counterbalanced by its neighbors, and only the end arches need to buttressed. With new construction materials (steel, concrete, engineered wood), not only the arches themselves got lighter, but the horizontal thrust can be further relieved by a tie connecting the ends of an arch (bowstring arch).

=== Funicular shapes ===
When evaluated from the perspective of an amount of material required to support a given load, the best solid structures are compression-only; with the flexible materials, the same is true for tension-only designs. There is a fundamental symmetry in nature between solid compression-only and flexible tension-only arrangements, noticed by Robert Hooke in 1676: "As hangs the flexible line, so but inverted will stand the rigid arch", thus the study (and terminology) of arch shapes is inextricably linked to the study of hanging chains, the corresponding curves or polygons are called funicular. Just as the shape of a hanging chain will vary depending on the weights attached to it, the shape of an ideal (compression-only) arch will depend on the distribution of the load.

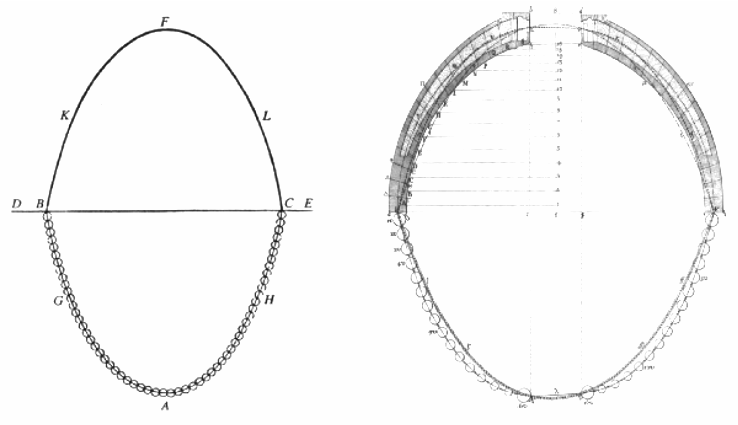
Analogy between an arch and a hanging chain and comparison to the dome of Saint Peter's Basilica in Rome (Giovanni Poleni, 1748)

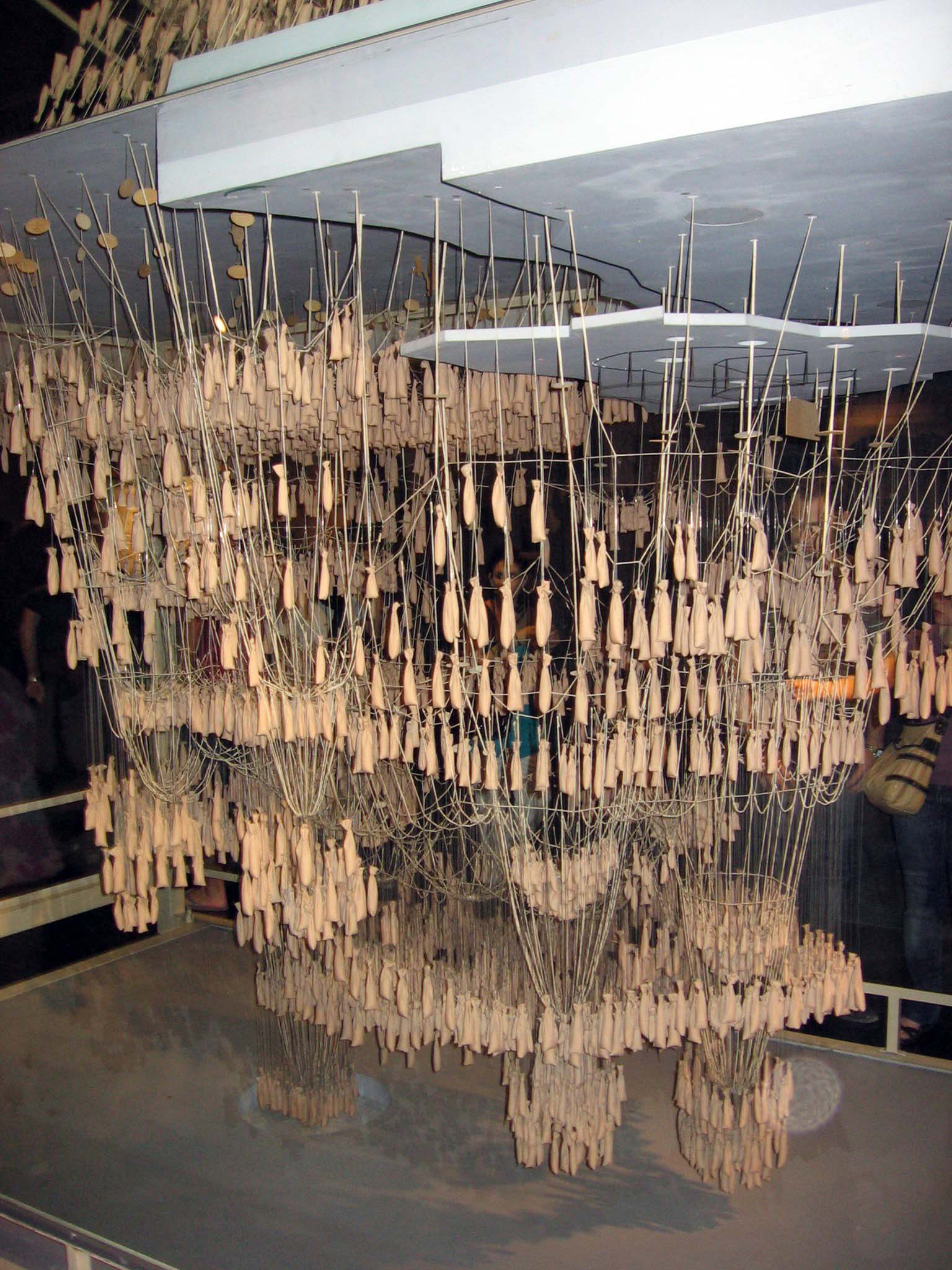
A complex funicular model (Church of Colònia Güell by Gaudi, 19th century)

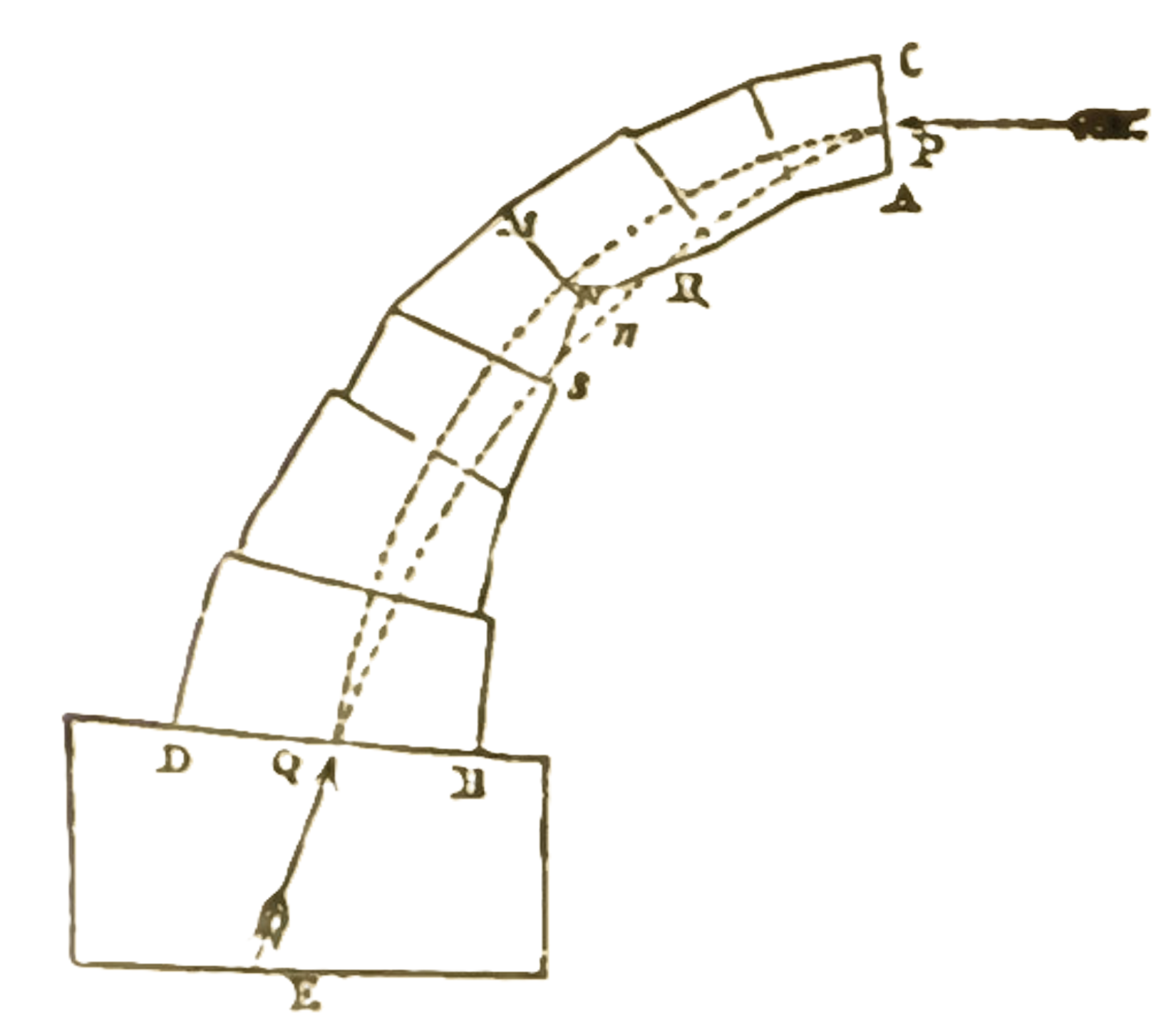
Arch diagram with pressure polygons drawn. A defect at the R-S portion of the intrados makes the arch susceptible to extra force along the line M-N, where the polygon curve can be pushed out of the envelope of the arch causing a collapse

While building masonry arches in the not very tall buildings of the past, a practical assumption was that the stones can withstand virtually unlimited amount of pressure (up to 100 N per mm^{2}), while the tensile strength was very low, even with the mortar added between the stones, and can be effectively assumed to be zero. Under these assumptions the calculations for the arch design are greatly simplified: either a reduced-scale model can be built and tested, or a funicular curve (pressure polygon) can be calculated or modeled, and as long as this curve stays within the confines of the voussoirs, the construction will be stable (a so called "safe theorem").

Early studies of arch thrust included Philippe de La Hire's work of 1712 and Charles-Augustin de Coulomb's 1773 treatment of sliding and rotation between voussoirs. Édouard Méry developed a graphical method for determining the line of thrust in 1828 and published it in 1840.

== Classifications ==
There are multiple ways to classify arches:

1. by the geometrical shape of its intrados (for example, semicircular, triangular, etc.);
2. for the arches with rounded intrados, by the number of circle segments forming the arch (for example, round arch is single-centred, pointed arch is two-centred); The geometrical centre of a segment is the point from which its circular curve is drawn in elevation.
3. by the material used (stone, brick, concrete, steel) and construction approach. For example, the wedge-shaped voussoirs of a brick arch can be made by cutting the regular bricks ("axed brick" arch) or manufactured in the wedge shape ("gauged brick" arch);
4. structurally, by the number of hinges (movable joints) between solid components. For example, voussoirs in a stone arch should not move, so these arches usually have no hinges (are "fixed"). Permitting some movement in a large structure allows to alleviate stresses (caused, for example, by the thermal expansion), so many arch bridge spans are built with three hinges (one at each support and one at the crown) since the mid-19th century.

== Arrangements ==
A sequence of arches can be grouped together forming an arcade. Romans perfected this form, as shown, for example, by arched structures of Pont du Gard. In the interior of hall churches, arcades of separating arches were used to separate the nave of a church from the side aisle, or two adjacent side aisles.

Two-tiered arches, with two arches superimposed, were sometimes used in Islamic architecture, mostly for decorative purposes.

Arches can be combined with lintels in a serliana, where the central opening is arched and the openings on either side have horizontal heads. Repeated serlianas form the loggias of Andrea Palladio's Basilica Palladiana in Vicenza.

An opening of the arch can be filled, creating a blind arch. Blind arches are frequently decorative, and were extensively used in Early Christian, Romanesque, and Islamic architecture. The space under the head of a blind arch is its lunette. A containing arch forms an outer frame around one or more smaller arches; the inner and outer profiles need not match. The galleries at Jumièges Abbey and Amiens Cathedral illustrate this arrangement, which was widely used in Romanesque and Gothic churches.

Multiple arches can be superimposed with an offset, creating an interlaced series of usually (with some exceptions) blind and decorative arches. Interlaced arcades were popular in Romanesque and Gothic architecture. The interlaced motif also has pre-Islamic precedents in Roman mosaics and the carved decoration of early Christian churches in Syria. An external wall may have a rear-arch (also rere-arch) around an opening on the side facing into the building. In a doorway, this arch can also hold the wooden door in place.

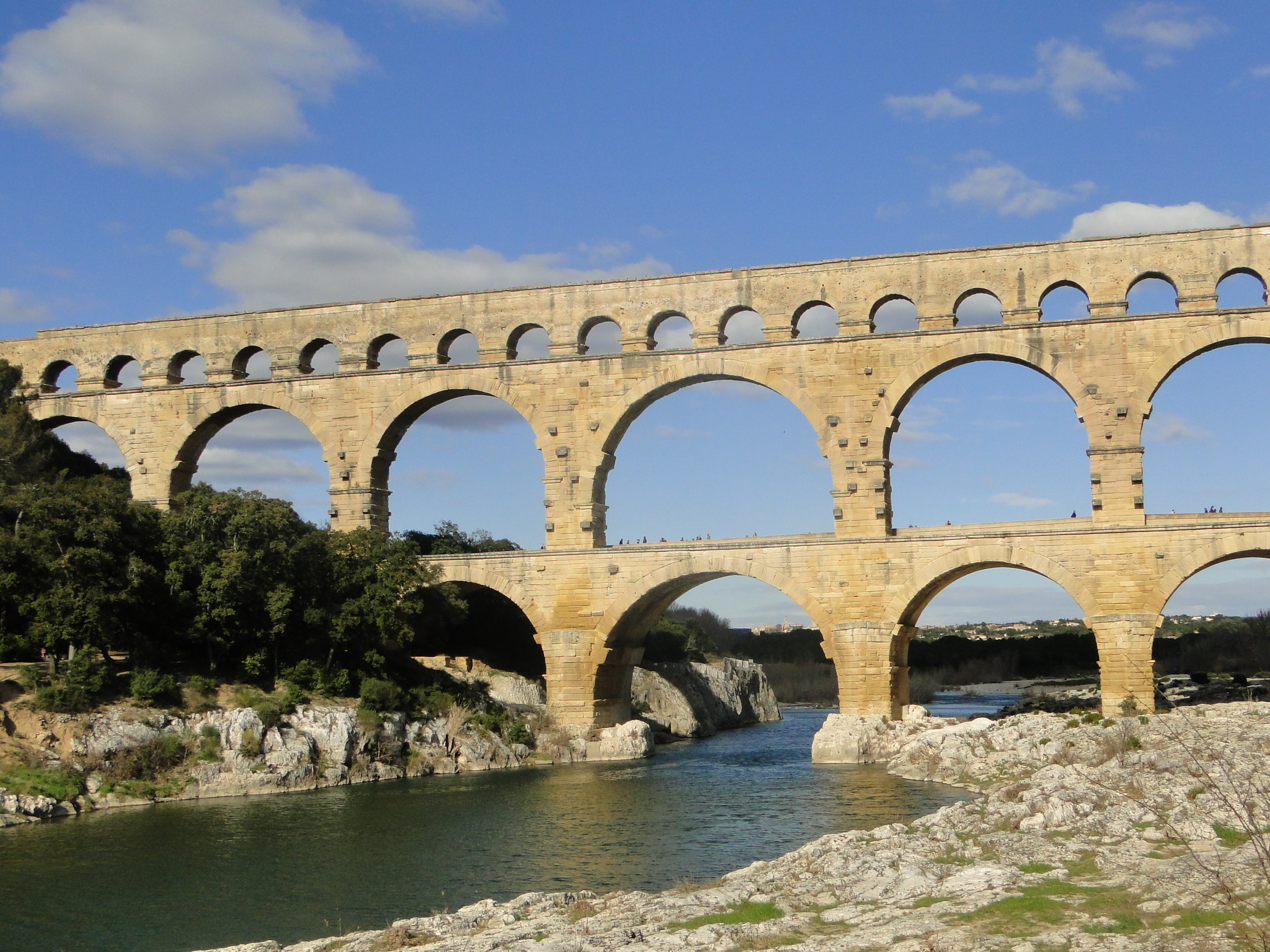
Arcades of Pont du Gard (Roman)

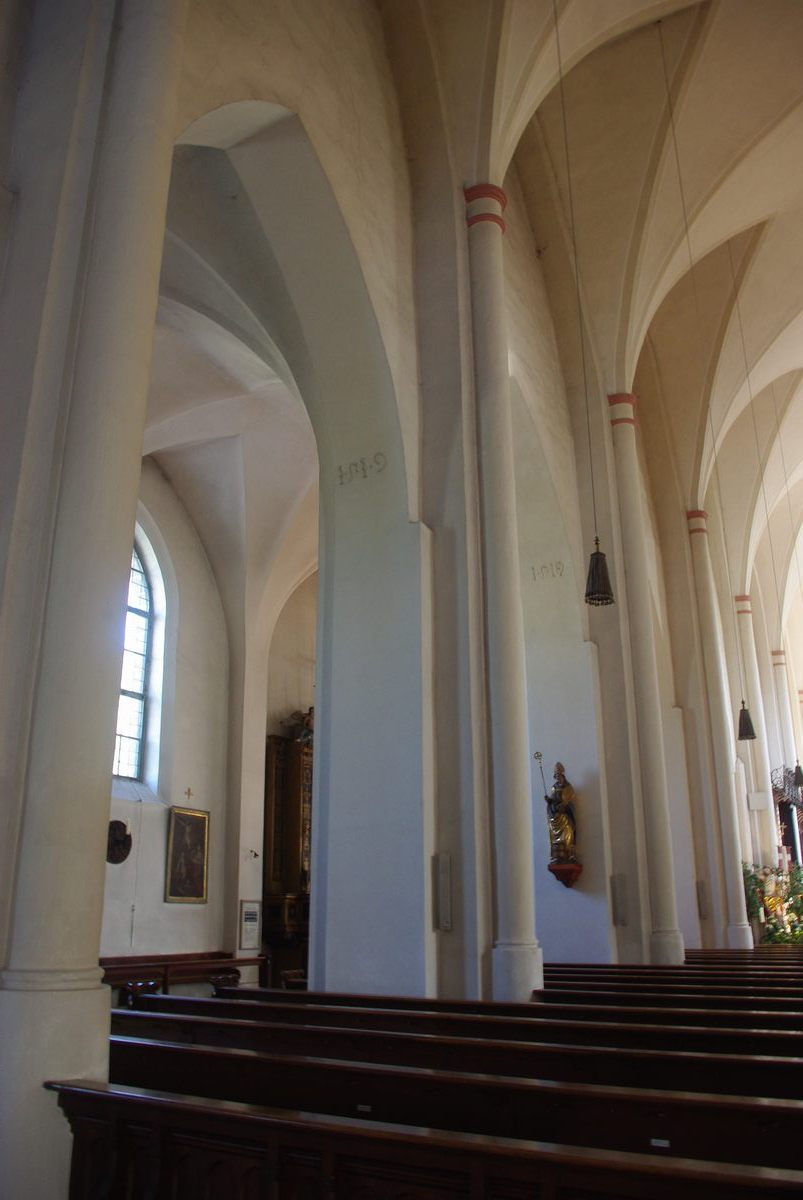
Separating arches in the St. Zeno church

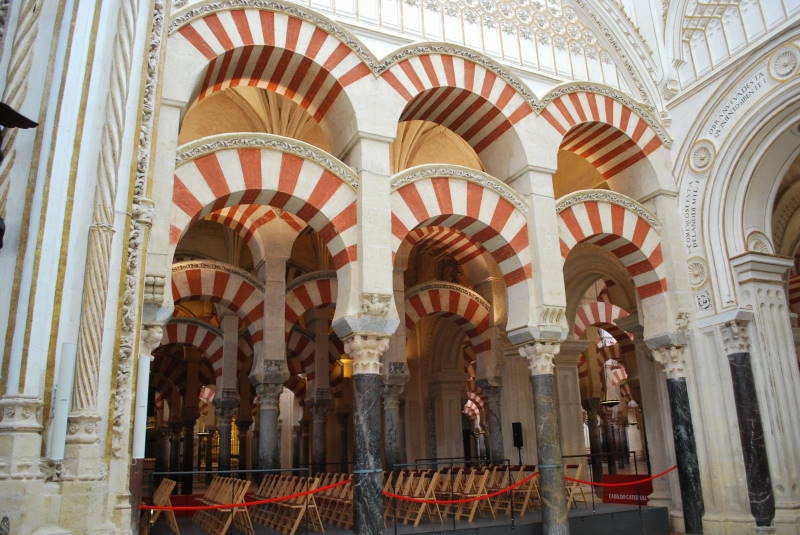
Two-tiered arches in the Mosque-Cathedral of Córdoba (Islamic)

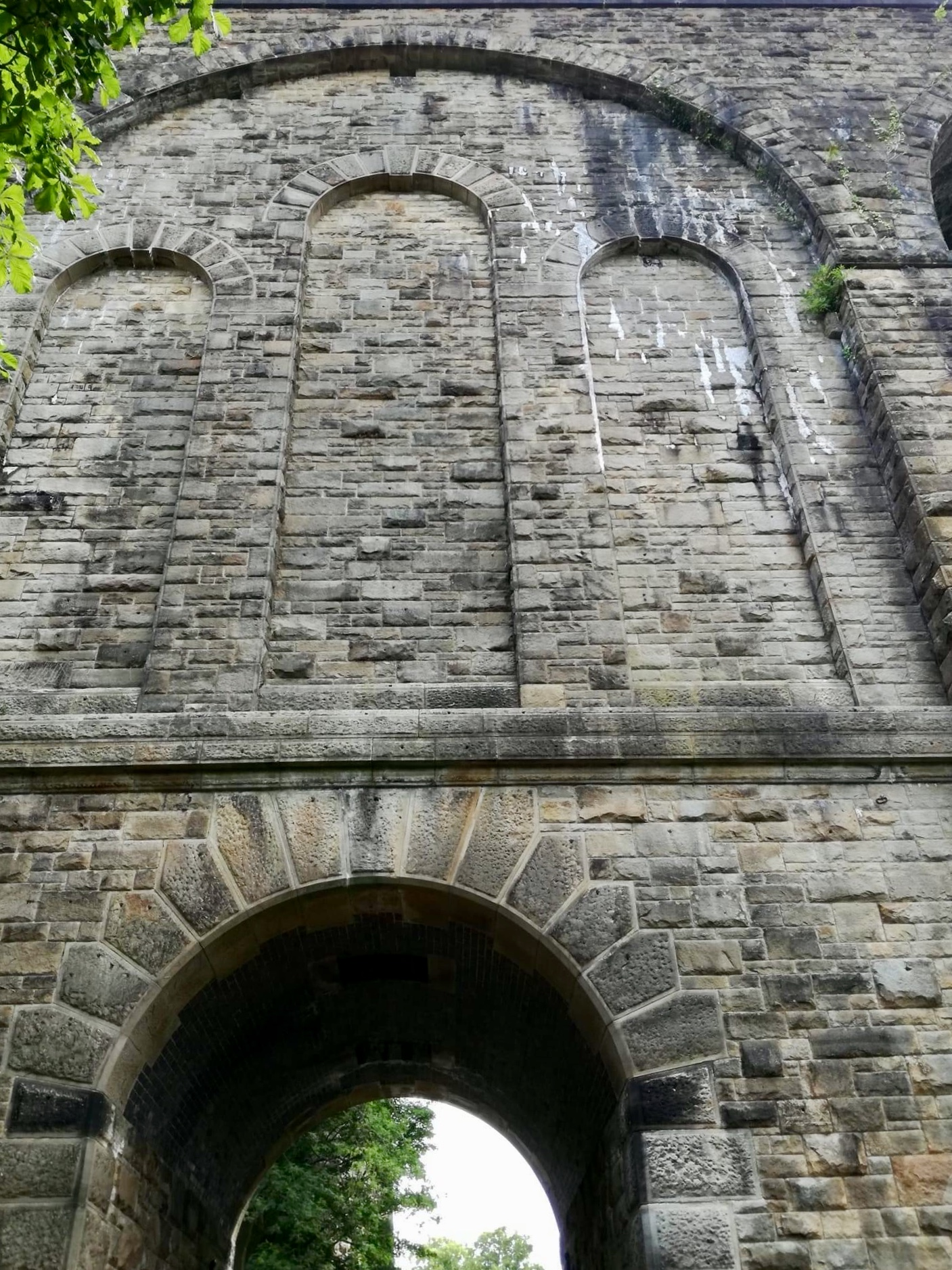
Large blind arch containing three smaller blind arches

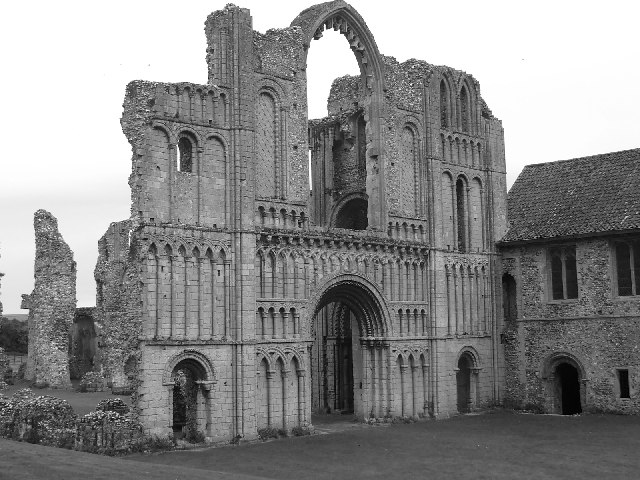
Interlaced arcade of blind arches at Castle Acre (Romanesque)

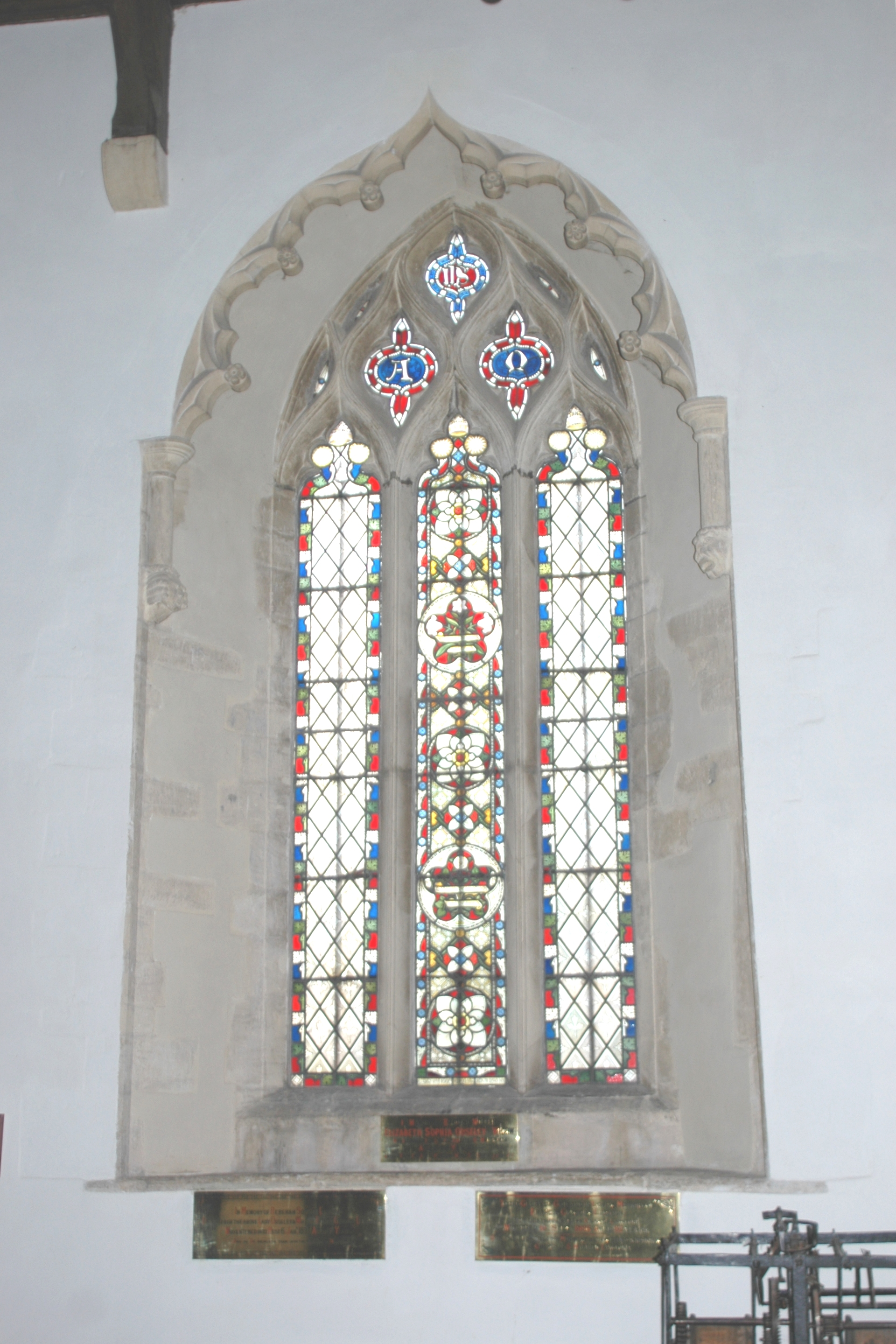
Rear arch around three lights at St Matthew's Church, Langford

=== Structural ===
Relieving arches carry loads above an opening or a thinner section of wall. They can accommodate large windows and gateways or direct loads towards stronger parts of a building, as in the Roman Pantheon. They were common in Roman brick construction and in Ottonian and Romanesque architecture, and also occur in Islamic buildings.

Transverse arches cross an interior at right angles to the side walls, subdividing it into bays and supporting vaults. They were common in Western architecture from the Carolingian period. A diaphragm arch also crosses the interior, but carries an exposed section of wall above it. The wall and arch can provide intermediate support beneath a high roof or vault, divide the roof into sections, or brace the side walls. Examples occur in Islamic buildings as well as in Carolingian, Ottonian, and Romanesque work.

A strainer arch prevents a wall or masonry pier from moving inwards by bracing it against another. Such arches often formed part of medieval repairs: Wells Cathedral (c. 1340) and Canterbury Cathedral (1495) have decorative examples that perform this structural role. This bracing also made it possible to use higher supports at the Great Mosque of Córdoba. Strainer arches can be "inverted" (upside-down) while remaining structural. When used across railway cuttings to prevent collapse of the walls, strainer arches may be referred to as flying arches. A counter-arch is built adjacent to another arch to oppose its horizontal action or help to stabilize it, for example, when constructing a flying buttress.

In foundations and at the base of tunnel linings, inverted arches can resist upward pressure from the ground.

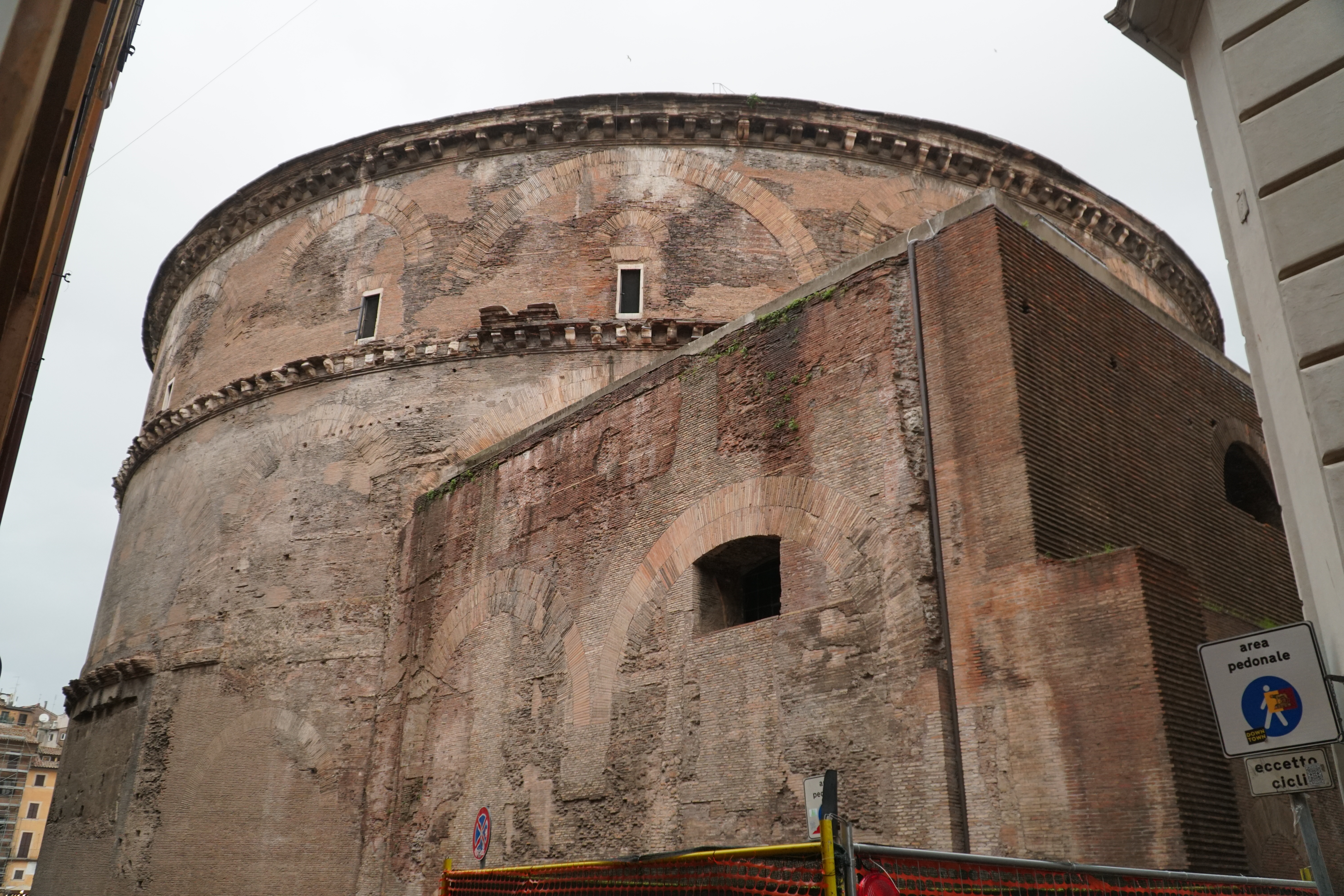
Relieving blind arches made of bricks at the Roman Pantheon

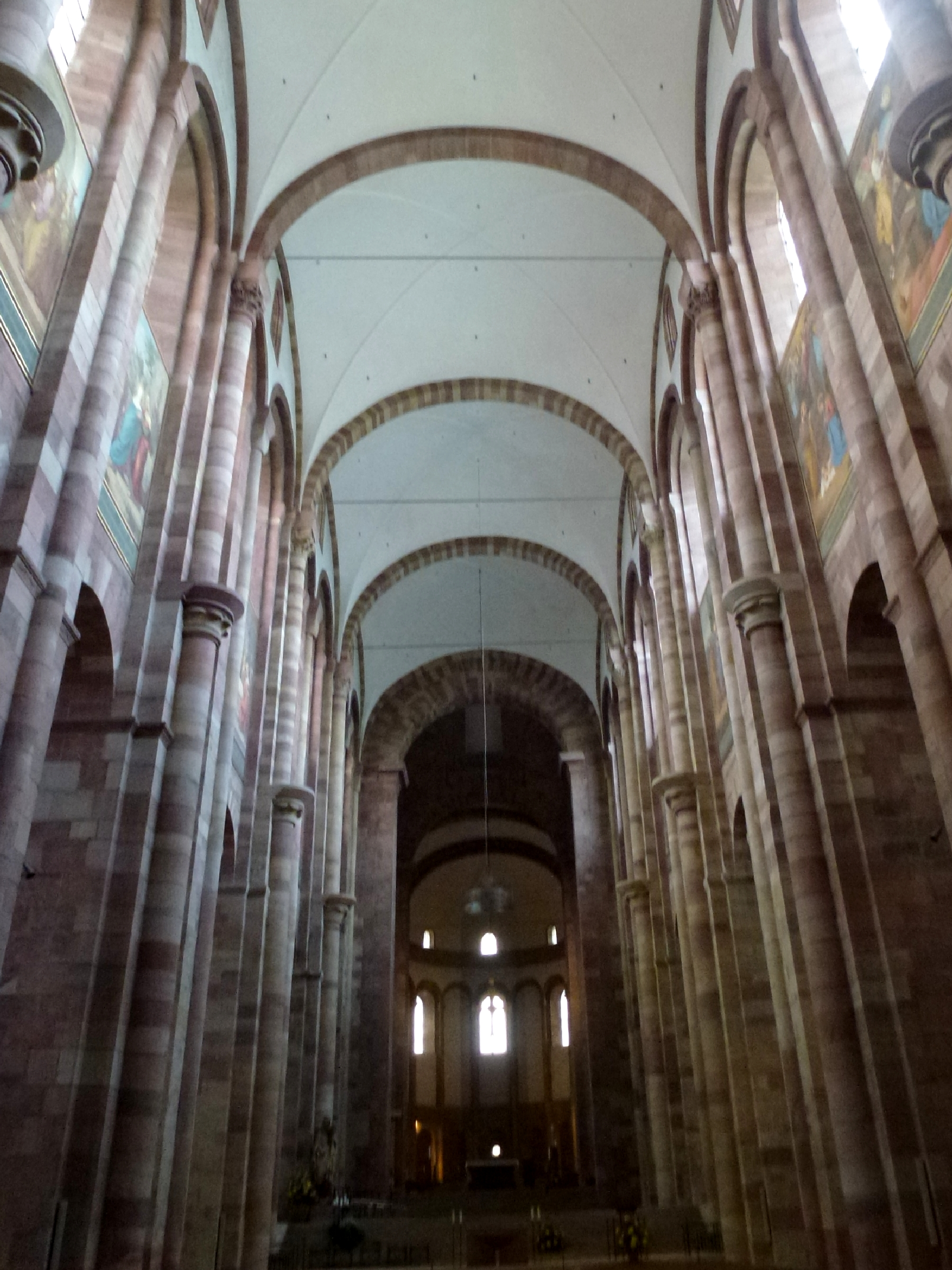
Transverse arches in Speyer Cathedral

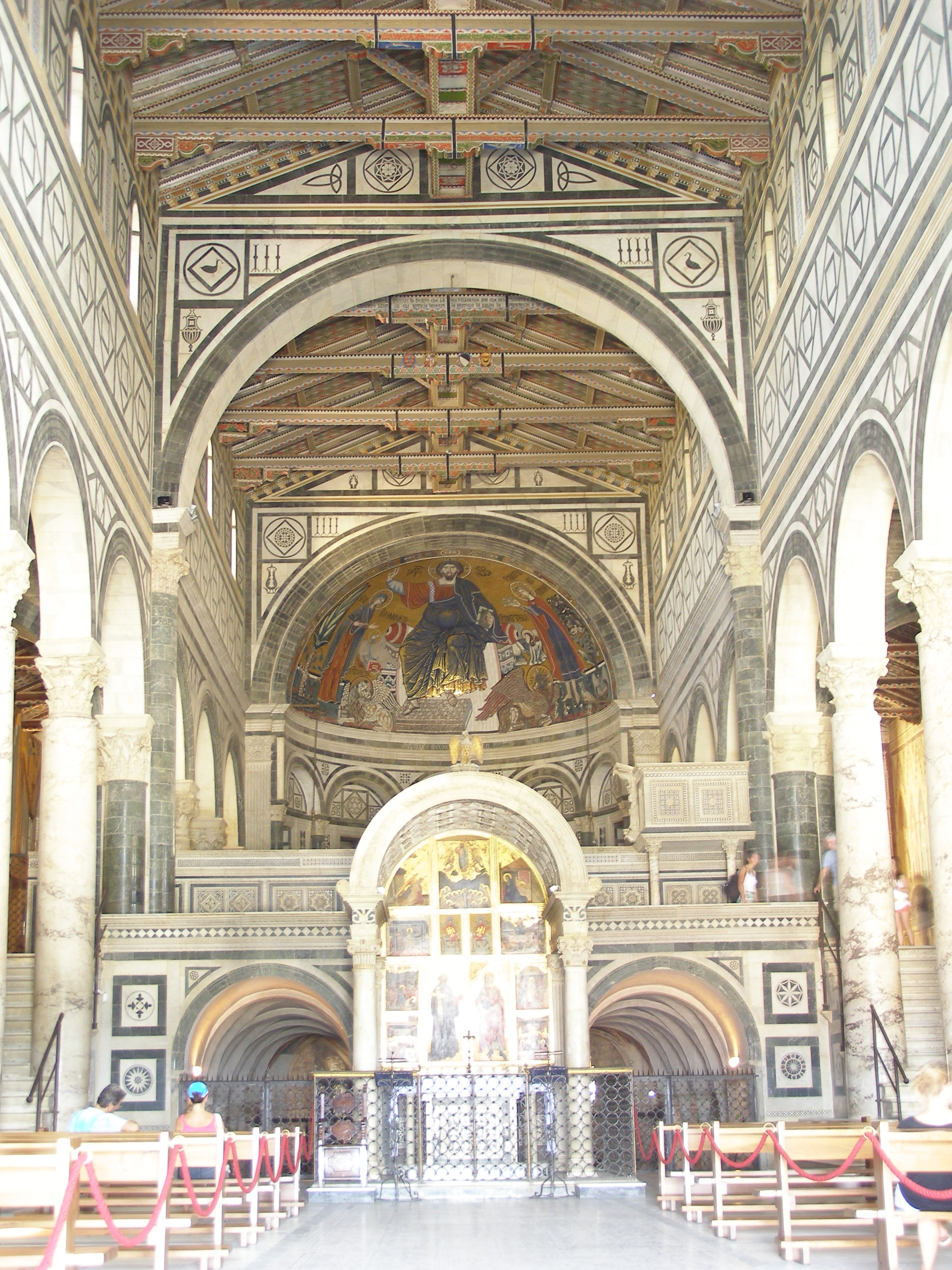
Diaphragm arch in San Miniato al Monte

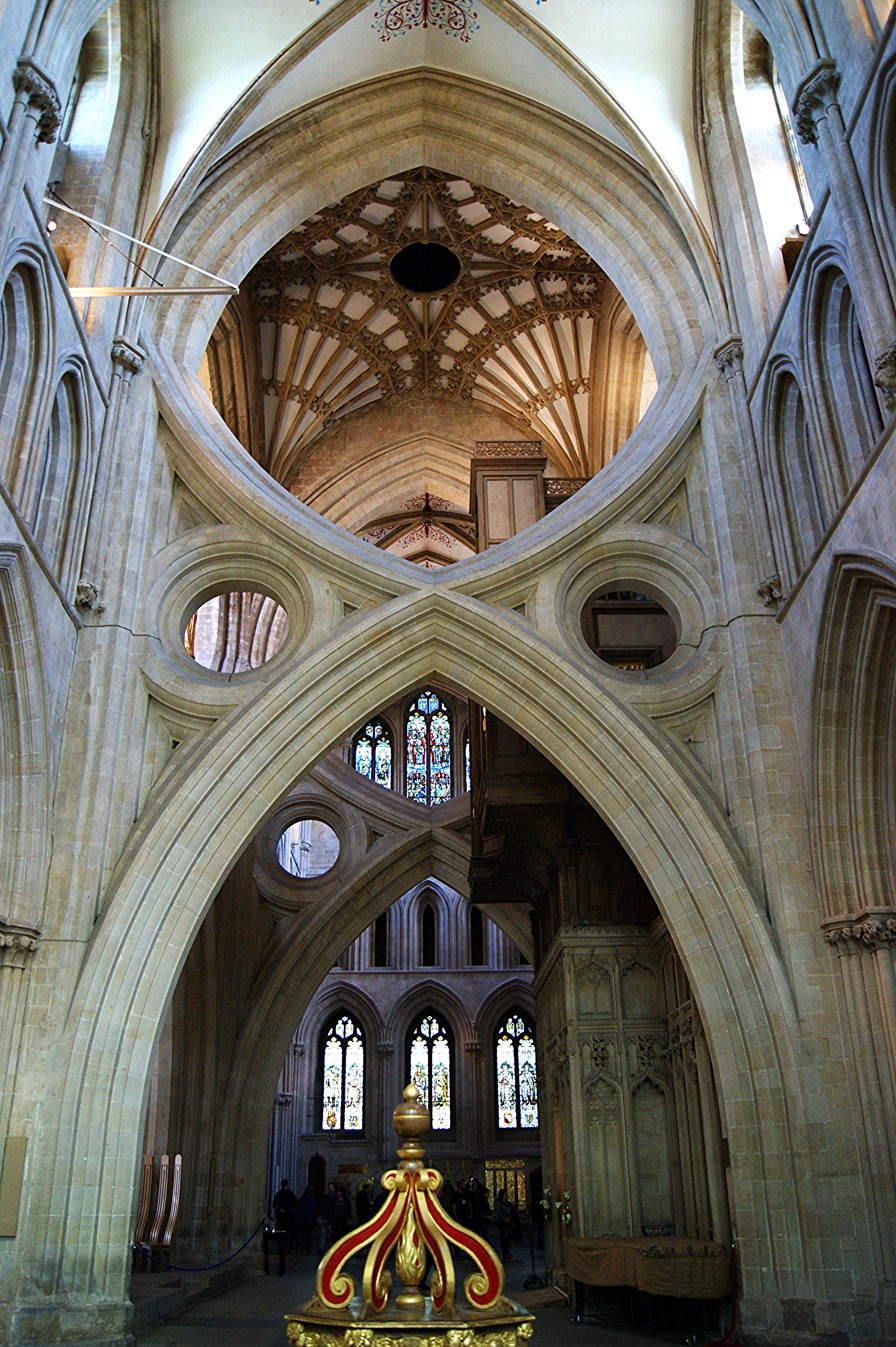
"Scissors" strainer arch arrangement in Wells Cathedral includes an inverted arch

== Shapes ==
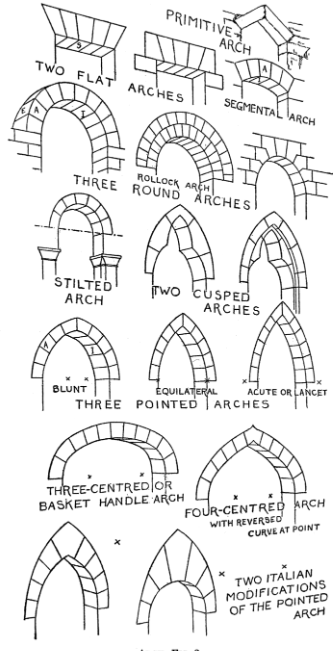
Types of arches

The large variety of arch shapes (left) can mostly be classified into three broad categories: rounded, pointed, and parabolic.

=== Rounded ===
"Round" semicircular arches were commonly used for ancient arches that were constructed of heavy masonry, and were relied heavily on by the Roman builders since the 4th century BC. It is considered to be the most common arch form, characteristic for Roman, Romanesque, and Renaissance architecture.

A segmental arch, with a rounded shape that is less than a semicircle, is very old (the versions were cut in the rock in Ancient Egypt c. 2100 BC at Beni Hasan). Since then it was occasionally used in Greek temples, utilized in Roman residential construction, Islamic architecture, and got popular as window pediments during the Renaissance.

A basket-handle arch (also known as depressed arch, three-centred arch, basket arch) consists of segments of three circles with origins at three different centers (sometimes uses five or seven segments, so can also be five-centred, etc.). Was used in late Gothic and Baroque architecture.

A horseshoe arch (also known as a keyhole arch) has a profile extending beyond a semicircle and may have a rounded or pointed apex. It is common in Islamic architecture and also occurs in Christian buildings in areas of Islamic influence, including Spain, Southern France, and Italy. The pointed variant was especially common in Afghanistan from about 1000 to 1250. Horseshoe profiles were occasionally used in Gothic vault ribs, and became popular for the front doors of English houses during the interwar period.

In a Florentine arch (also known as "Venetian", "Italian" on the illustration), the distance between intrados and extrados grows closer to the apex. It can combine rounded intrados with pointed extrados.

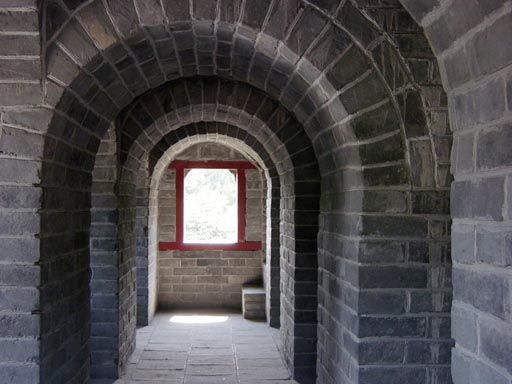
Semi-circular arches using brick and/or stone block construction at the Great Wall, China

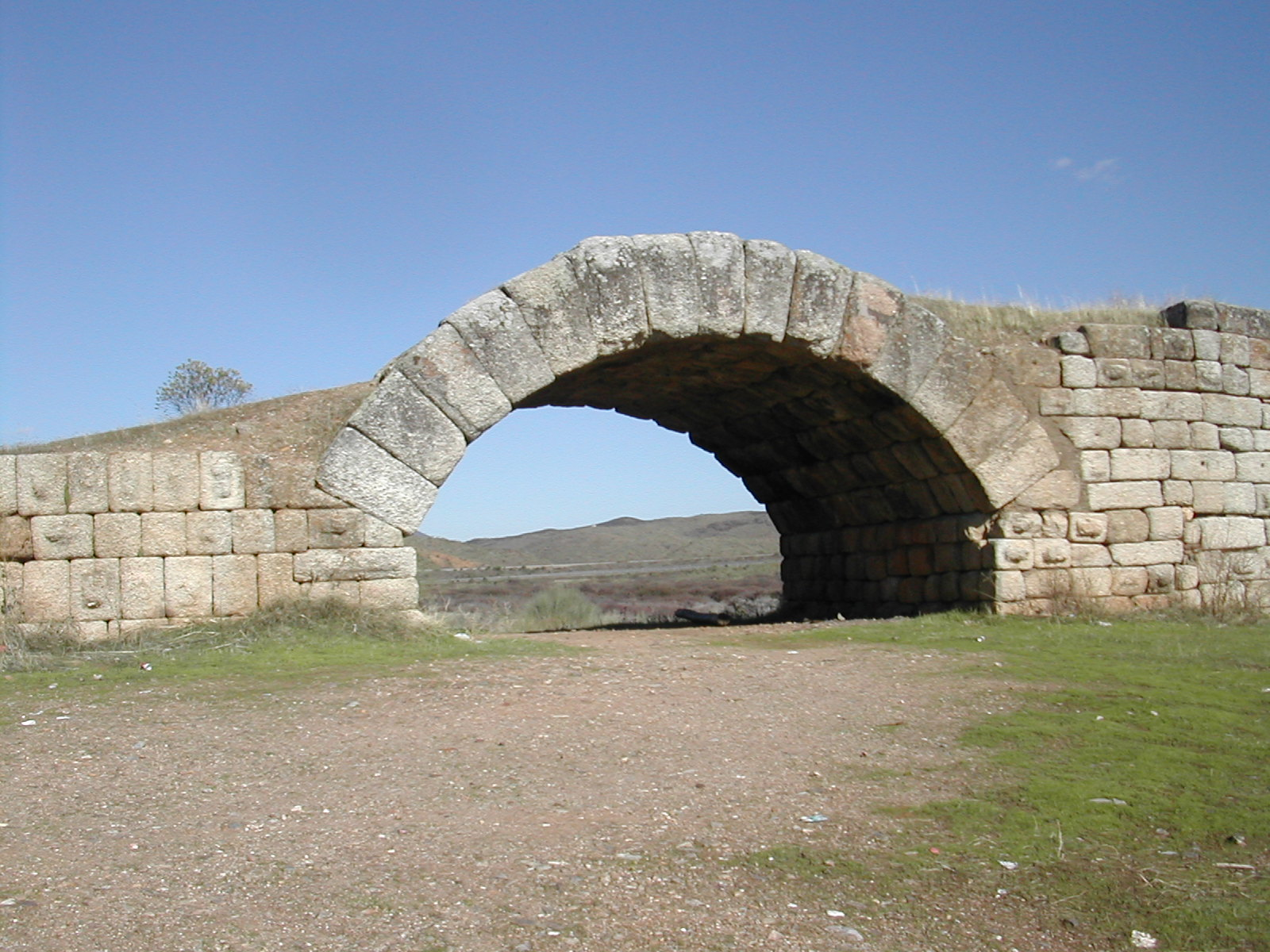
Segmental arch of the Alconétar Bridge

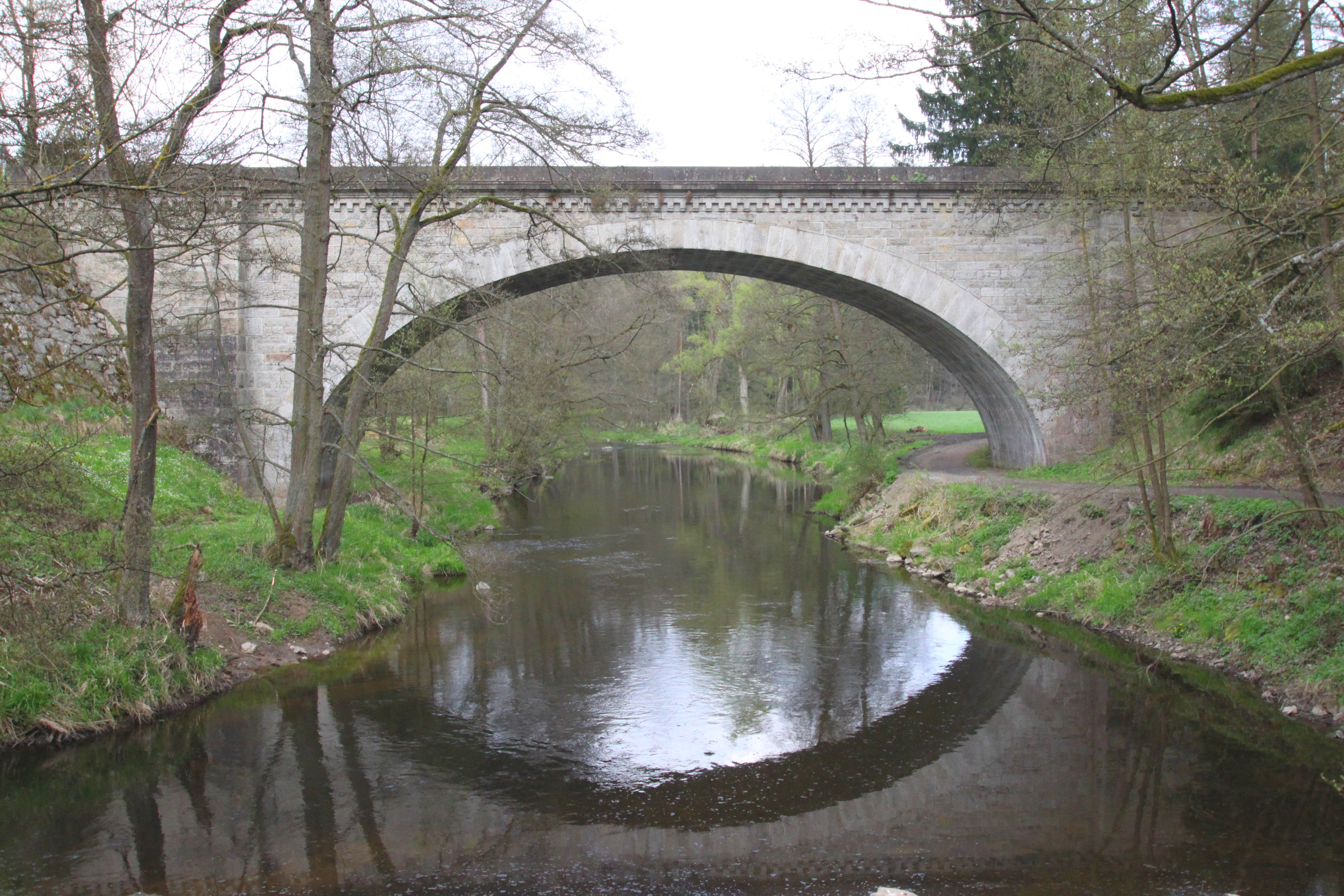
Bridge with a basket handle arch

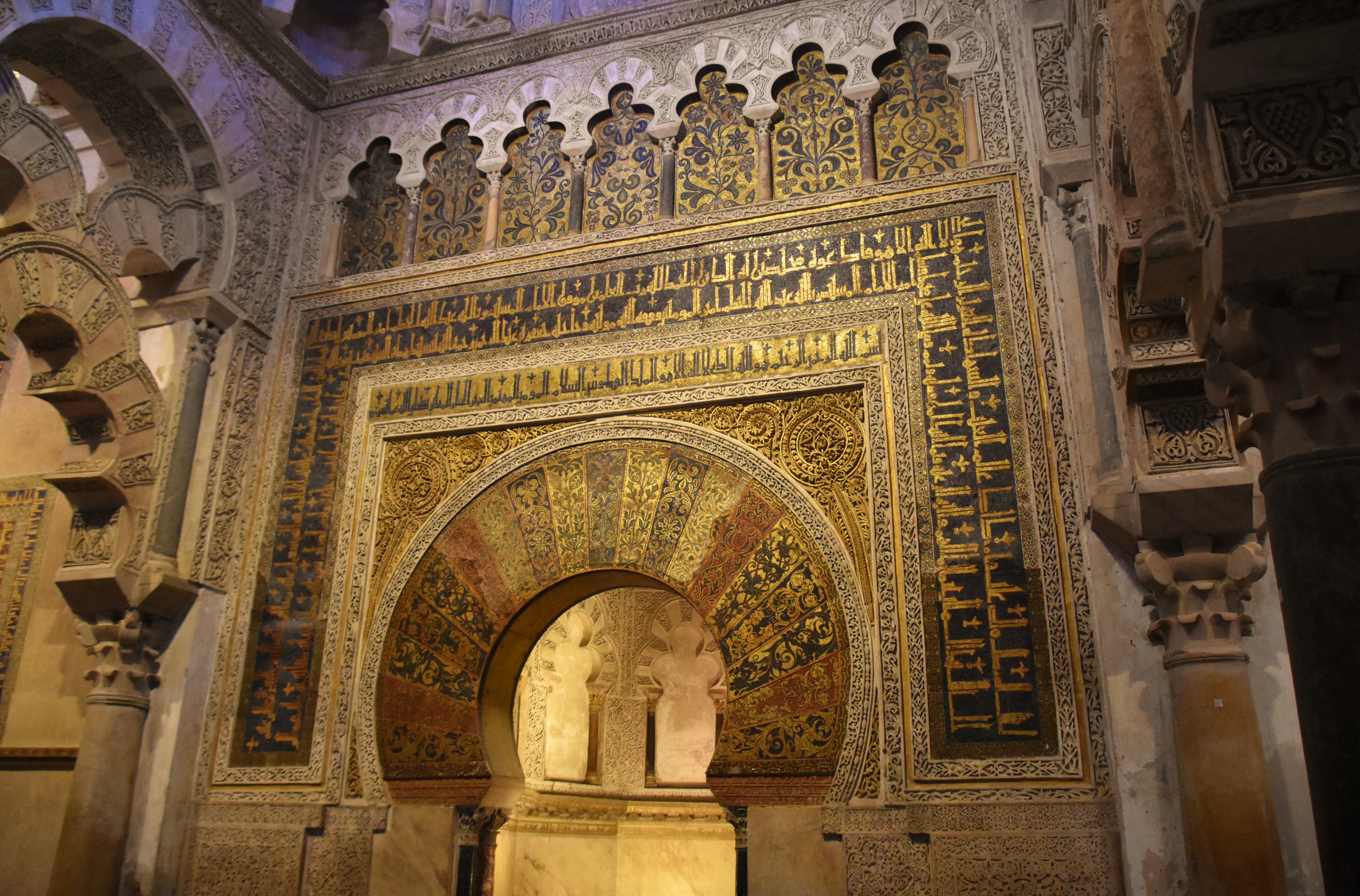
Horseshoe arch in the Great Mosque of Cordoba

=== Pointed ===
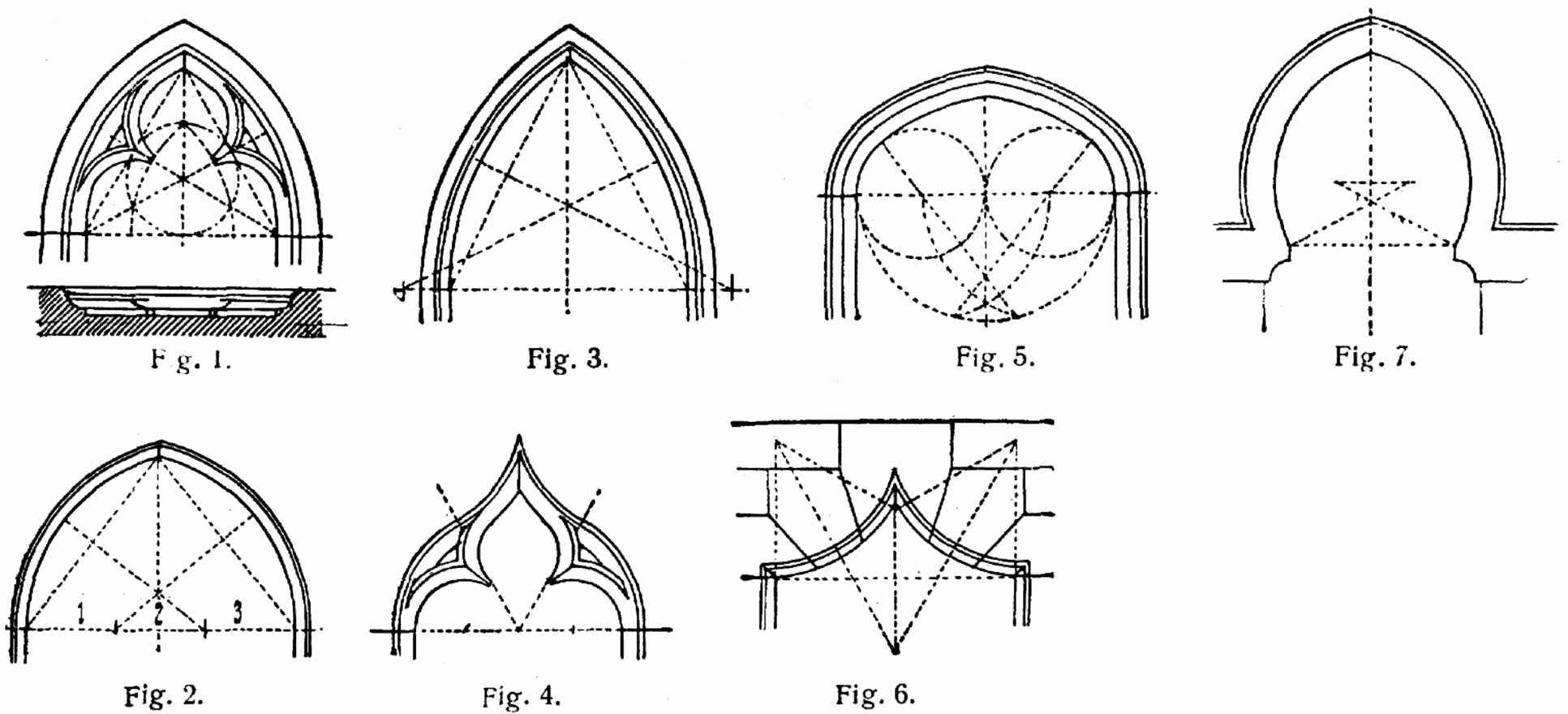
Pointed arches, 1 - equilateral with trefoil treatment, 2 - blunt, 3 - lancet, 4 - ogee, 5 - four-centred, 6 - curtain (inflexed), 7 - pointed horseshoe

A pointed arch consists of two ("two-centred arch") or more circle segments culminating in a point at the top. Early examples occur at Qasr Ibn Wardan in Syria (AD 561–564), and the form subsequently became widespread in Islamic architecture. It was used in Western Europe in the second half of the 11th century, including at Monte Cassino and Cluny Abbey, and later became prominent in Gothic architecture.

The advantages of a pointed arch over a semicircular one are flexible ratio of span to rise and lower horizontal reaction at the base. This innovation allowed for taller and more closely spaced openings, which are typical of Gothic architecture.

Equilateral arch is the most common form of the pointed arch, with the centers of two circles forming the intrados coinciding with the springing points of the opposite segment. Together with the apex point, they form an equilateral triangle, thus the name. If the centers of circles are farther apart, the arch becomes a narrower and sharper lancet arch that appeared in France in the Early Gothic architecture (Saint-Denis Abbey) and became prominent in England in the late 12th and early 13th centuries (Salisbury Cathedral). If the centers are closer to another, the result is a wider blunt arch.

The intrados of the cusped arch (also known as multifoil arch, polyfoil arch, polylobed arch, and scalloped arch) includes several independent circle segments in a scalloped arrangement. These primarily decorative arches are common in Islamic architecture and Northern European Late Gothic, can be found in Romanesque architecture. A similar trefoil arch includes only three segments and sometimes has a rounded, not pointed, top. Common in Islamic architecture and Romanesque buildings influenced by it, it later became popular in the decorative motifs of the Late Gothic designs of Northern Europe.

Each arc of an ogee arch consists of at least two circle segments (for a total of at least four), with the center of an upper circle being outside the extrados. The English Decorated style, French Flamboyant, Venetian, and other Late Gothic styles made frequent use of the ogee. European examples date back to the west front of St Mark's Basilica in Venice (around 1250) and the Eleanor crosses in England (from 1291). Ogee arch is also known as reversed curve arch, occasionally also called an inverted arch. A nodding ogee has an apex that projects forwards from the wall. In early 14th-century England, where it was widely used, it usually served no structural purpose. Examples include the pulpitum of Southwell Minster and the Lady Chapel of Ely Cathedral.

Each arc of a four-centred arch is made of two circle segments with distinct centers; usually the radius used closer to the springing point is smaller with a more pronounced curvature. Common in Islamic architecture (Persian arch), and, with upper portion flattened almost to straight lines (Tudor arch), in the English Perpendicular Gothic.A keel arch is a variant of four-centred arch with haunches almost straight, resembling a section view of a capsized ship. Popular in Islamic architecture, it can be also found in Europe, occasionally with a small ogee element at the top, so it is sometimes considered to be a variation of an ogee arch.

Curtain arch (also known as inflexed arch, and, like the keel arch, usually decorative) uses two (or more) drooping curves that join at the apex. Utilized as a dressing for windows and doors primarily in Saxony in the Late Gothic and early Renaissance buildings (late 15th to early 16th century), associated with Arnold von Westfalen. When the intrados has multiple concave segments, the arch is also called a draped arch or tented arch. A similar arch that uses a mixture of curved and straight segments or exhibits sharp turns between segments is a mixed-line arch (or mixtilinear arch). In Moorish architecture the mixed-line arch evolved into an ornate lambrequin arch, also known as muqarnas arch.

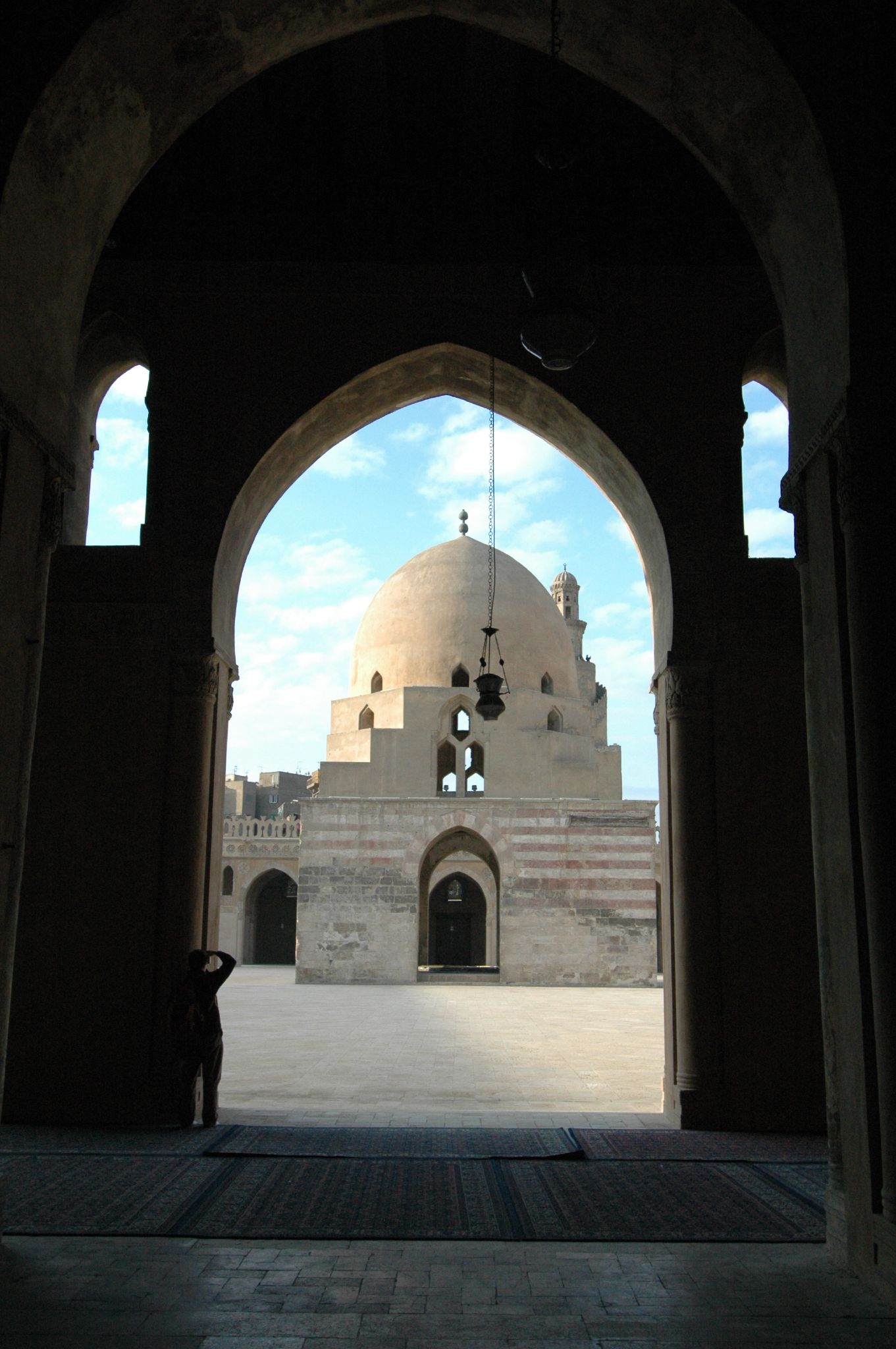
Pointed arches of Mosque of Ibn Tulun (9th century AD)

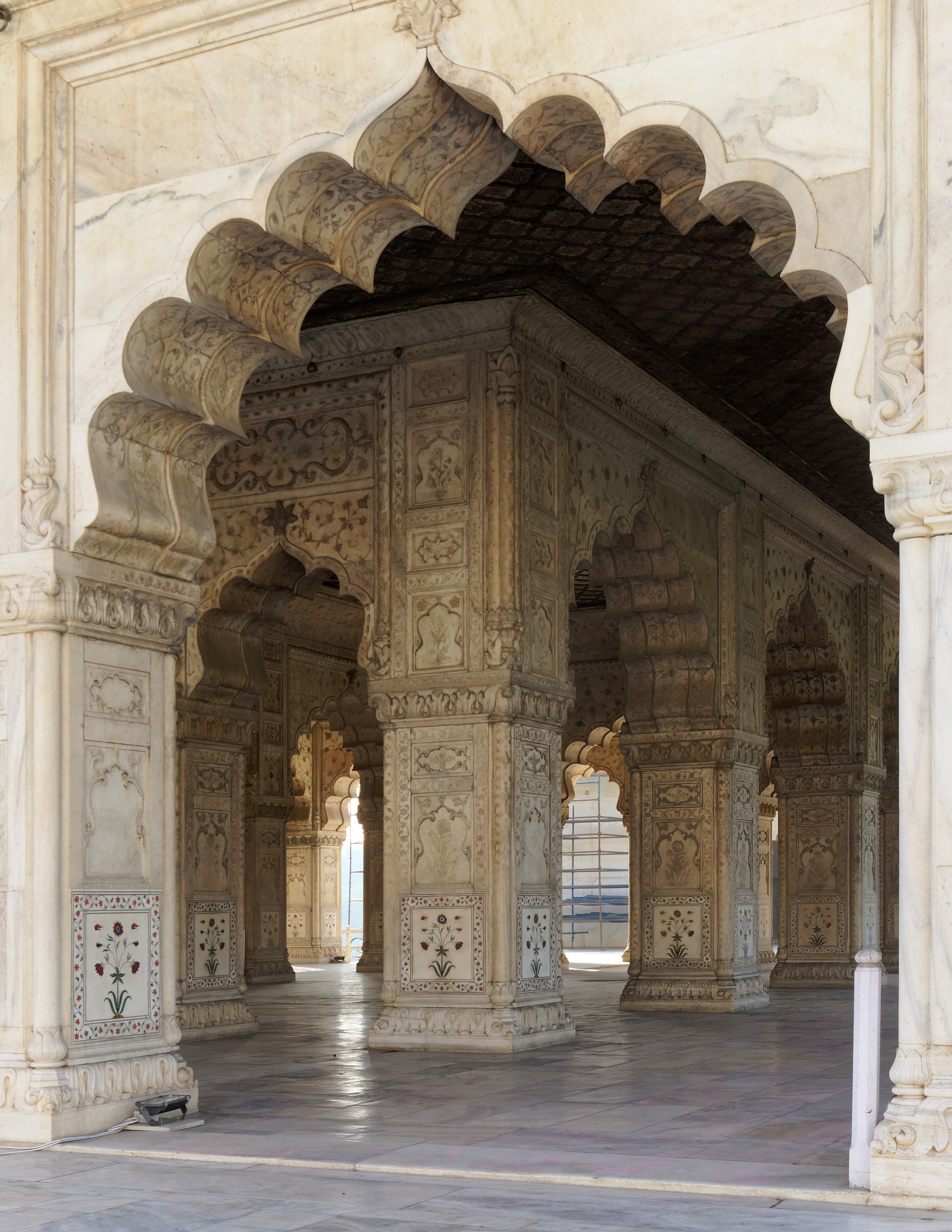
Cusped arch in Diwan-i-Khas (Red Fort)

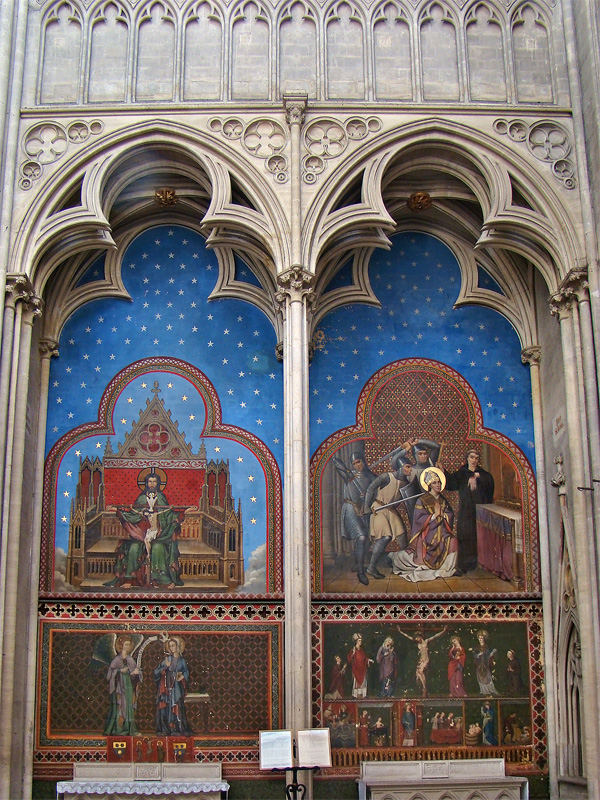
Trefoil arch in the Bayeux Cathedral

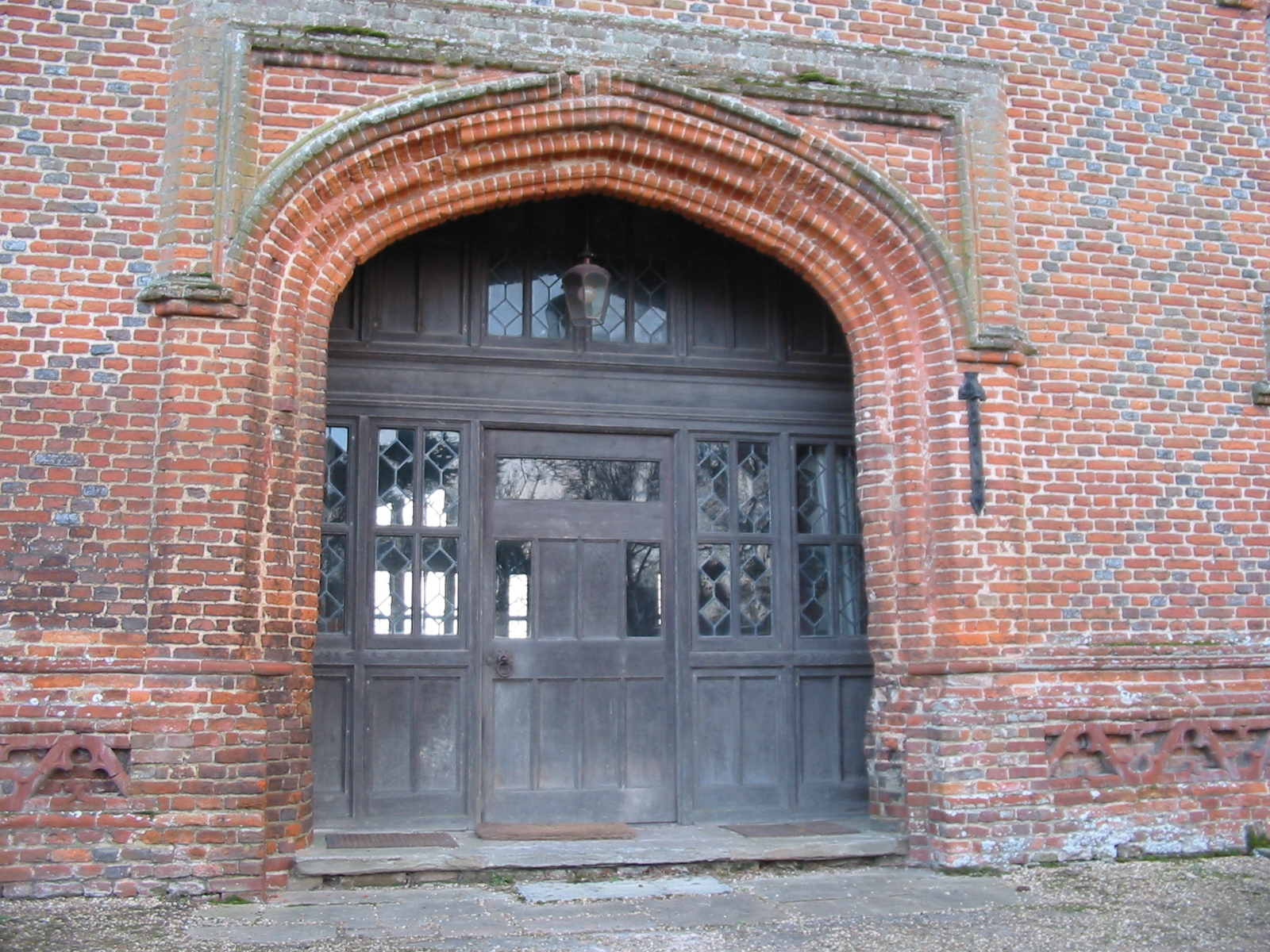
Tudor arch at Layer Marney Tower

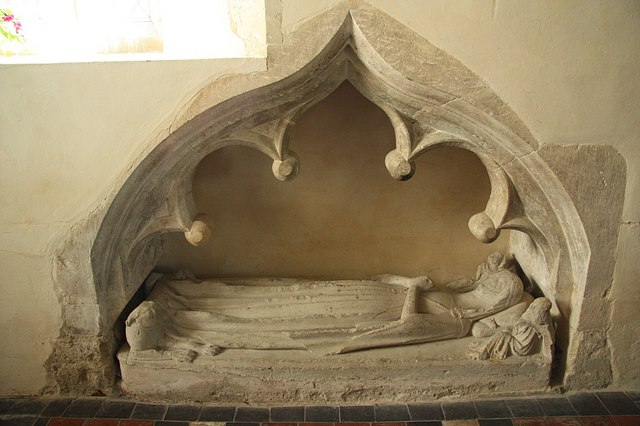
Ogee arch at St Mary the Virgin, Silchester

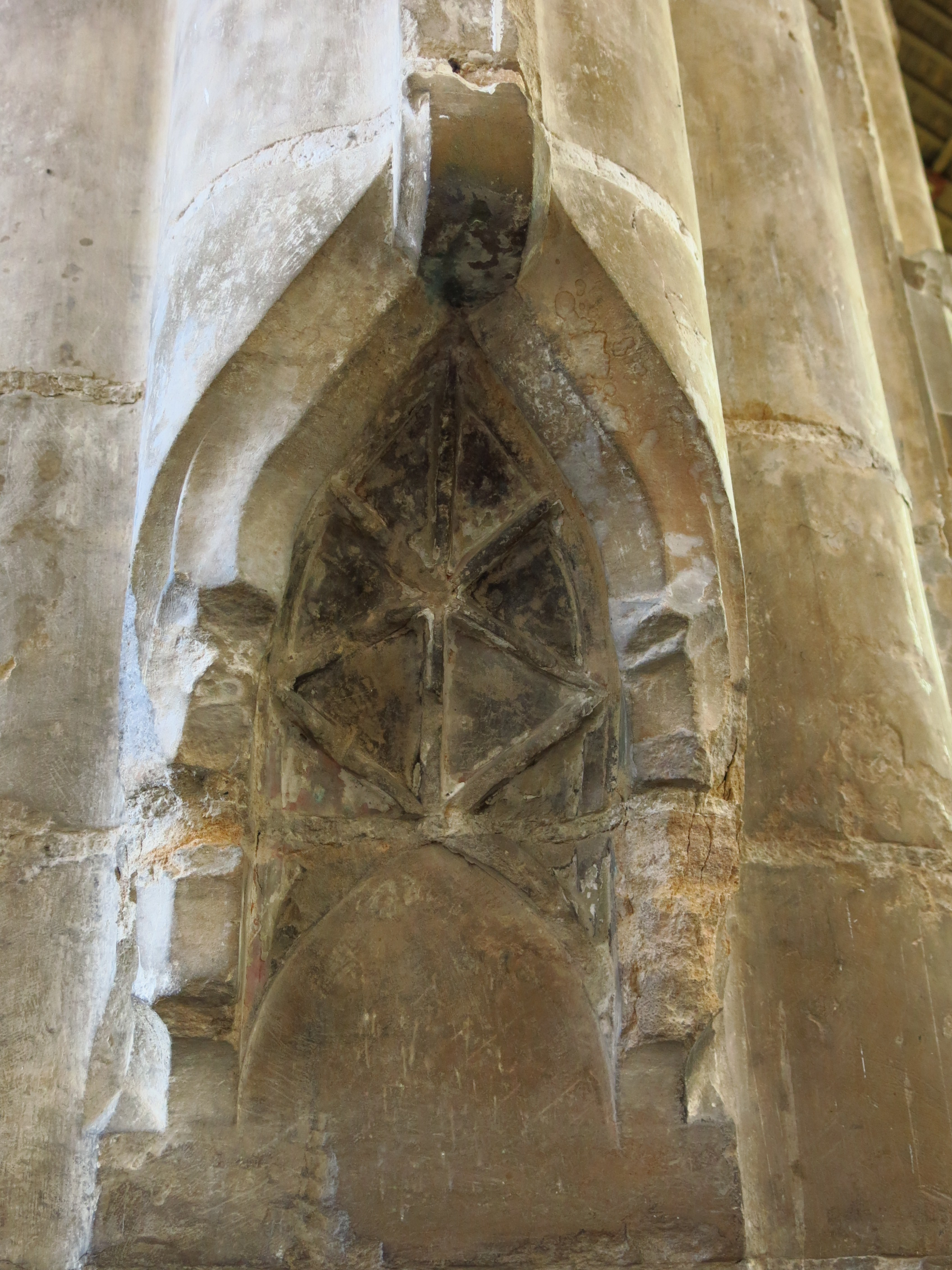
Nodding ogee niche at St Peter's Church, Walpole St Peter

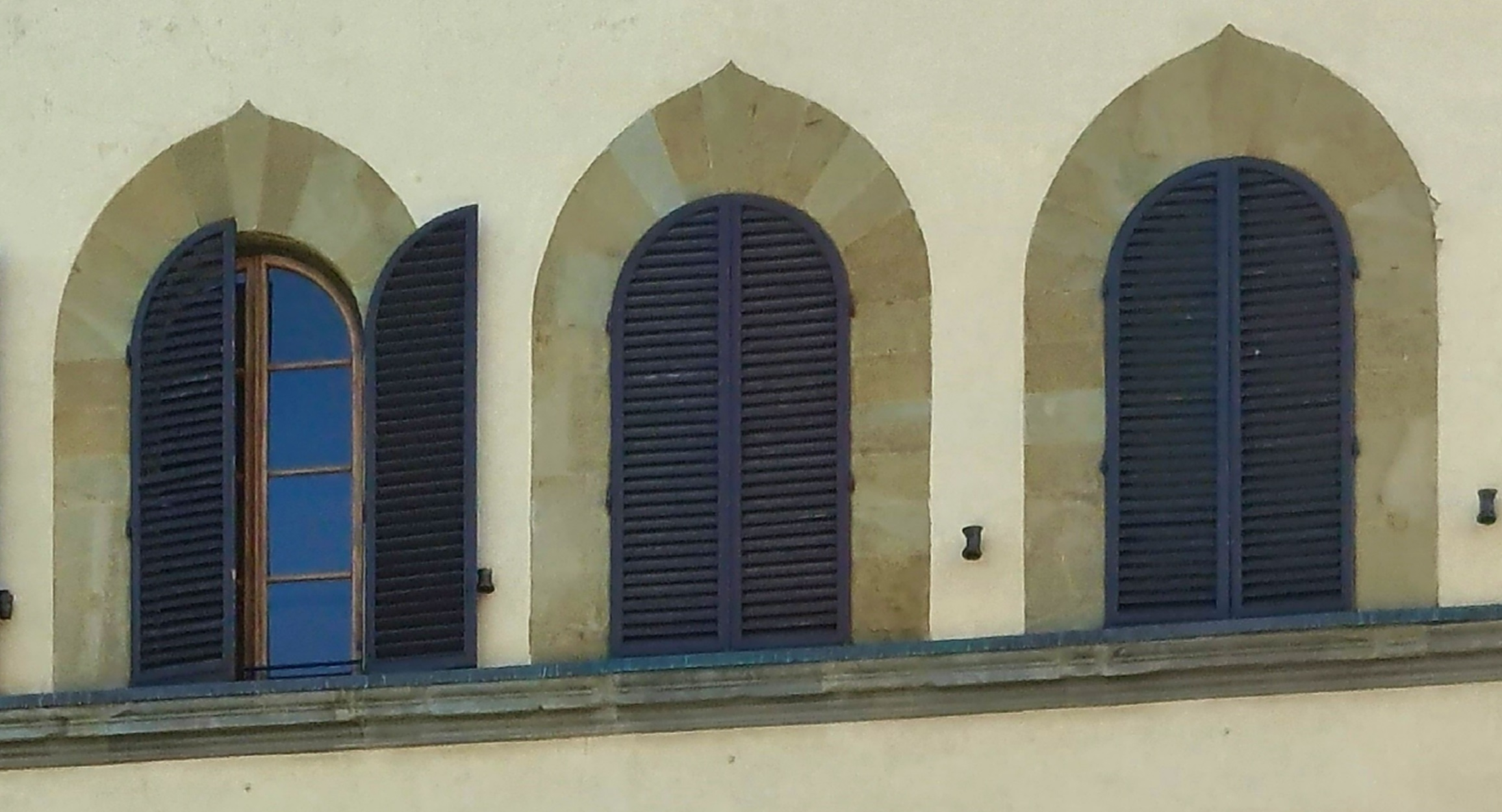
Keel arches at Palazzo Guadagni

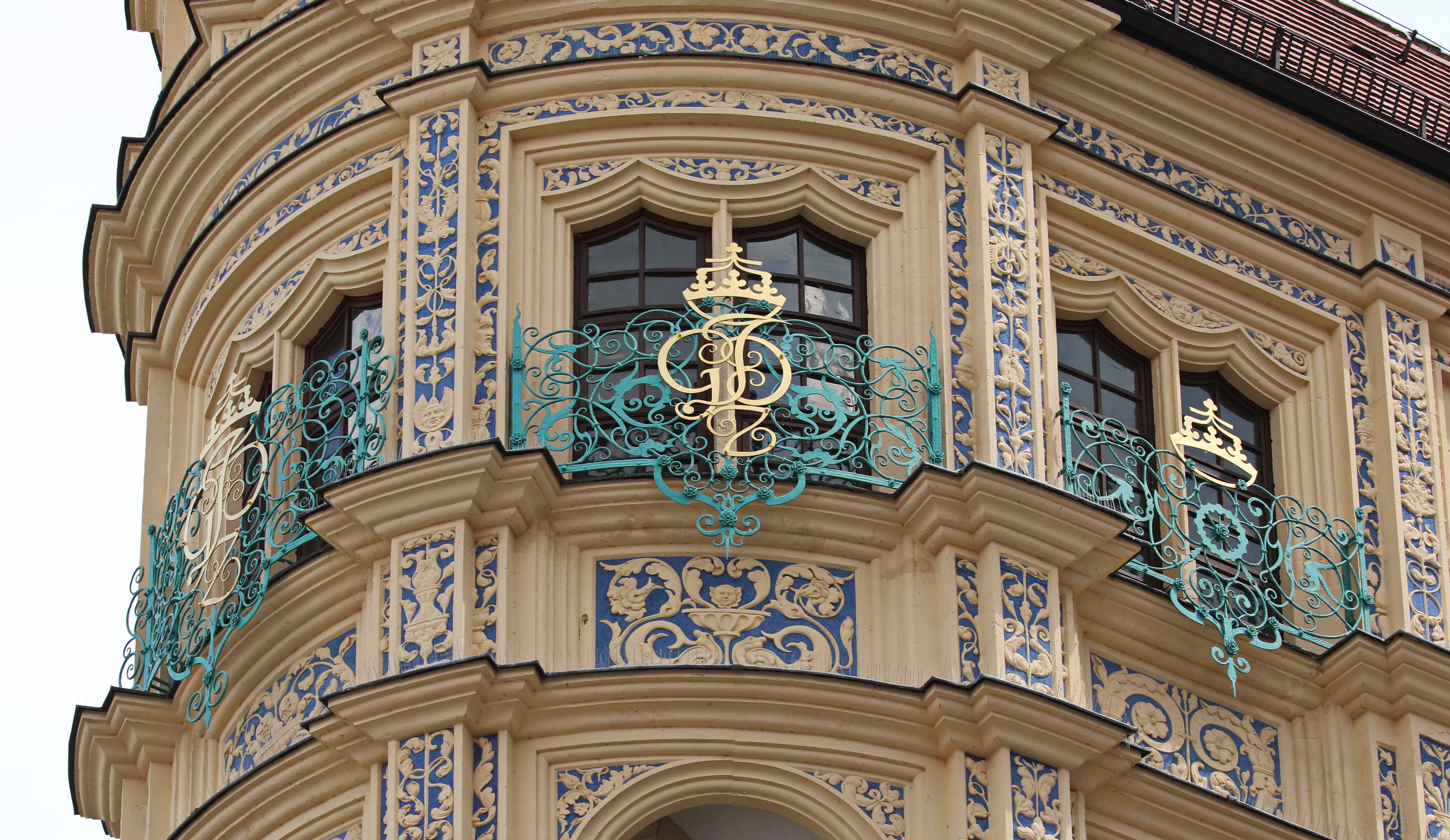
Curtain arches over windows in Hartenfels Castle

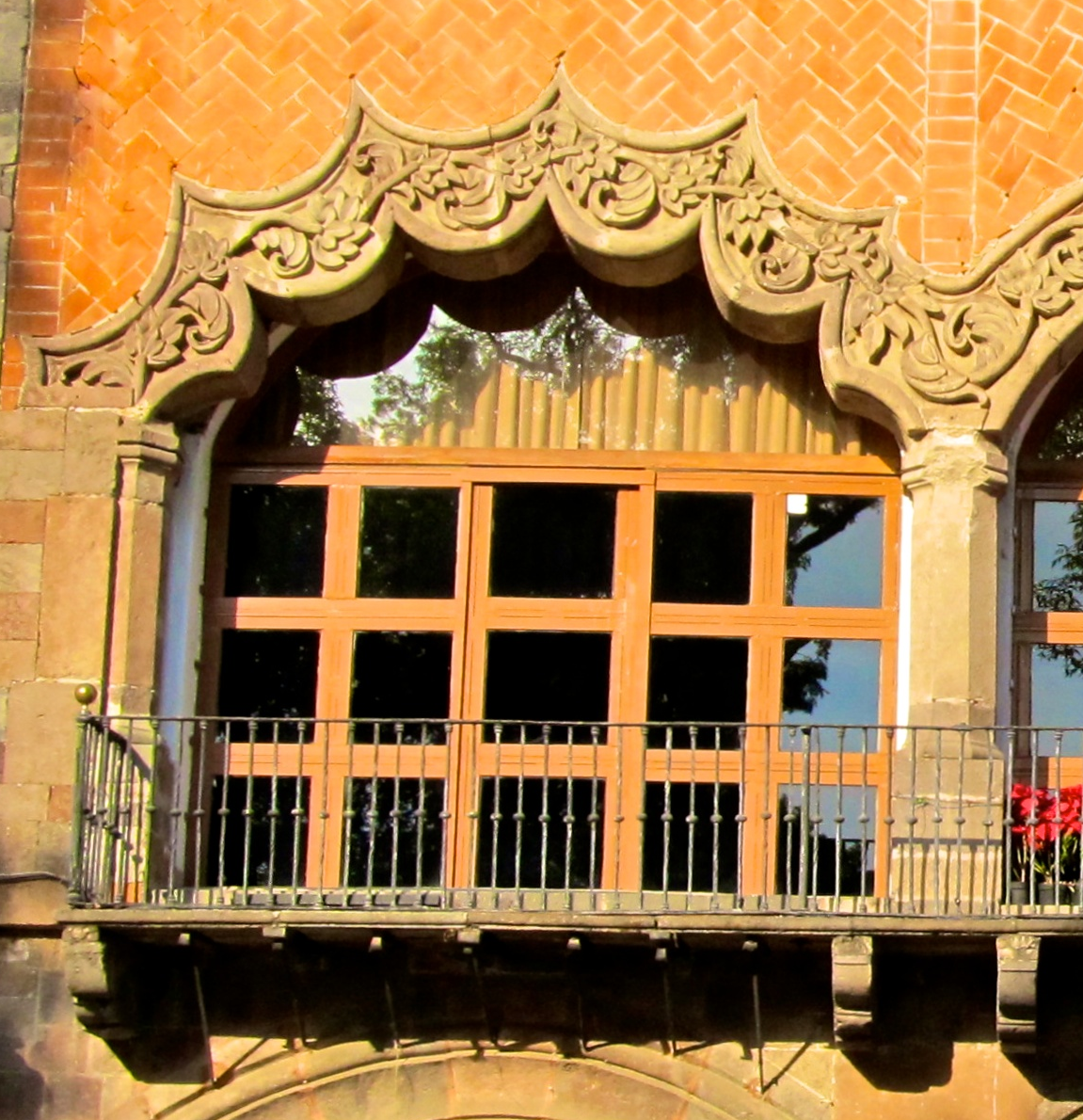
A draped arch at the Government Palace of Tlaxcala (1545)

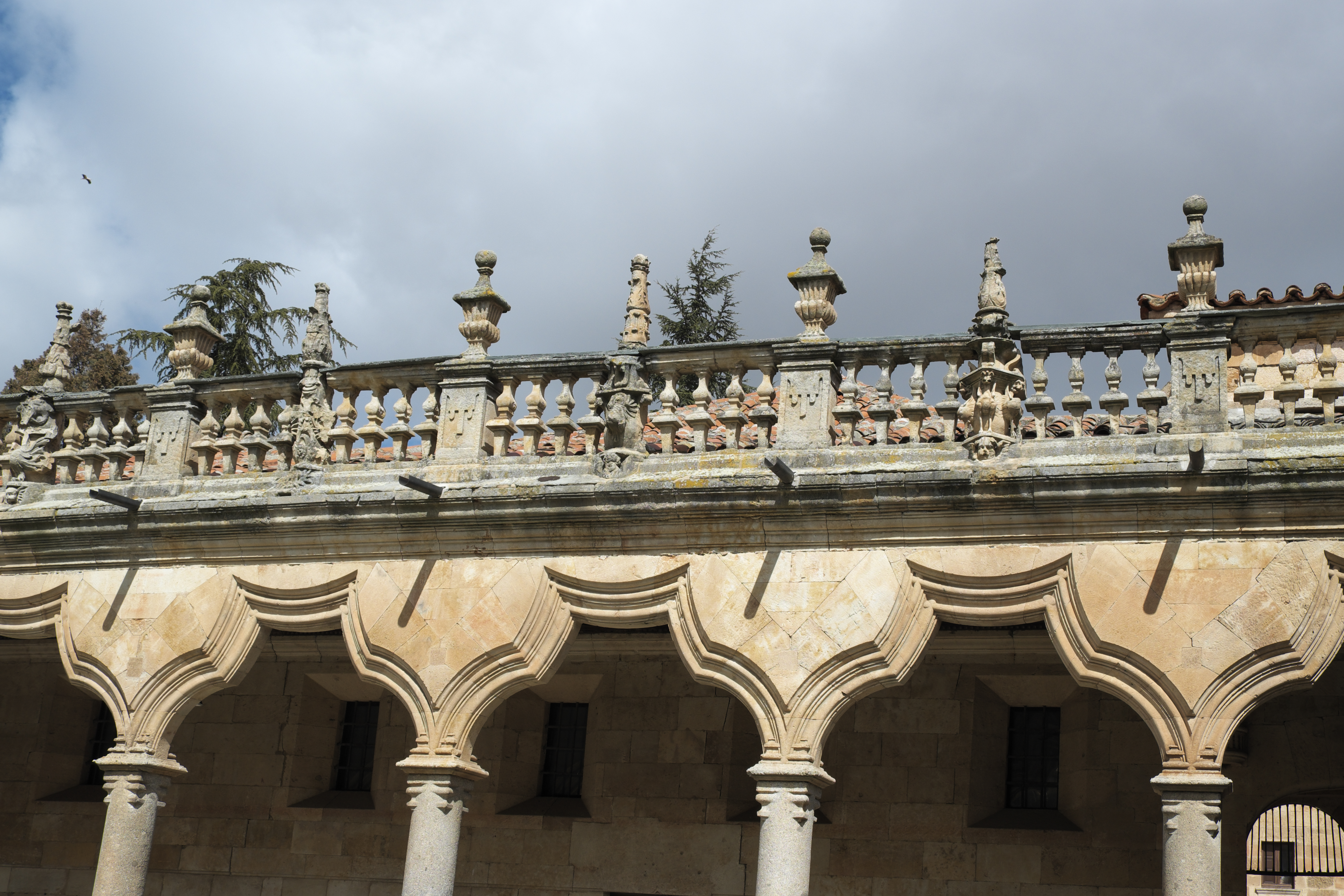
Mixed-line arches at Escuelas Menores (Salamanca)

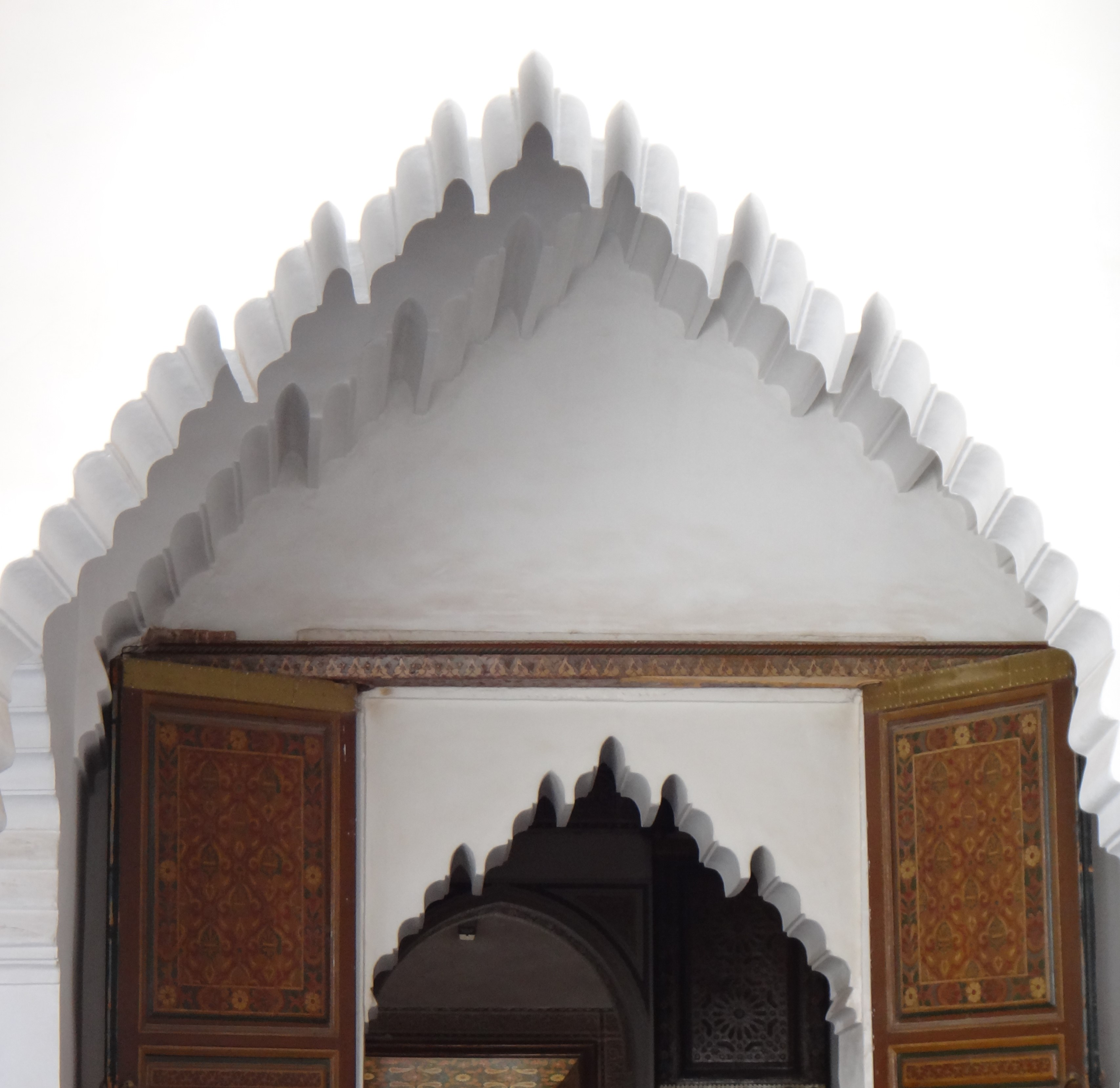
Lambrequin arch at Bahia Palace in Morocco

=== Parabolic ===
The popularity of the arches using segments of a circle is due to simplicity of layout and construction, not their structural properties. Consequently, the architects historically used a variety of other curves in their designs: elliptical curves, hyperbolic cosine curves (including catenary), and parabolic curves. There are two reasons behind the selection of these curves:

1. they are still relatively easy to trace with common tools prior to construction;
2. depending on a situation, they can have superior structural properties and/or appearance.

The hyperbolic curve is not easy to trace, but there are known cases of its use. The non-circumferential curves look similar, and match at shallow profiles, so a catenary is often misclassified as a parabola (per Galileo, "the [hanging] chain fits its parabola almost perfectly"). González et al. provide an example of Palau Güell, where researchers do not agree on classification of the arches or claim the prominence of parabolic arches, while the measurements show that just two of the 23 arches designed by Gaudi are actually parabolic.

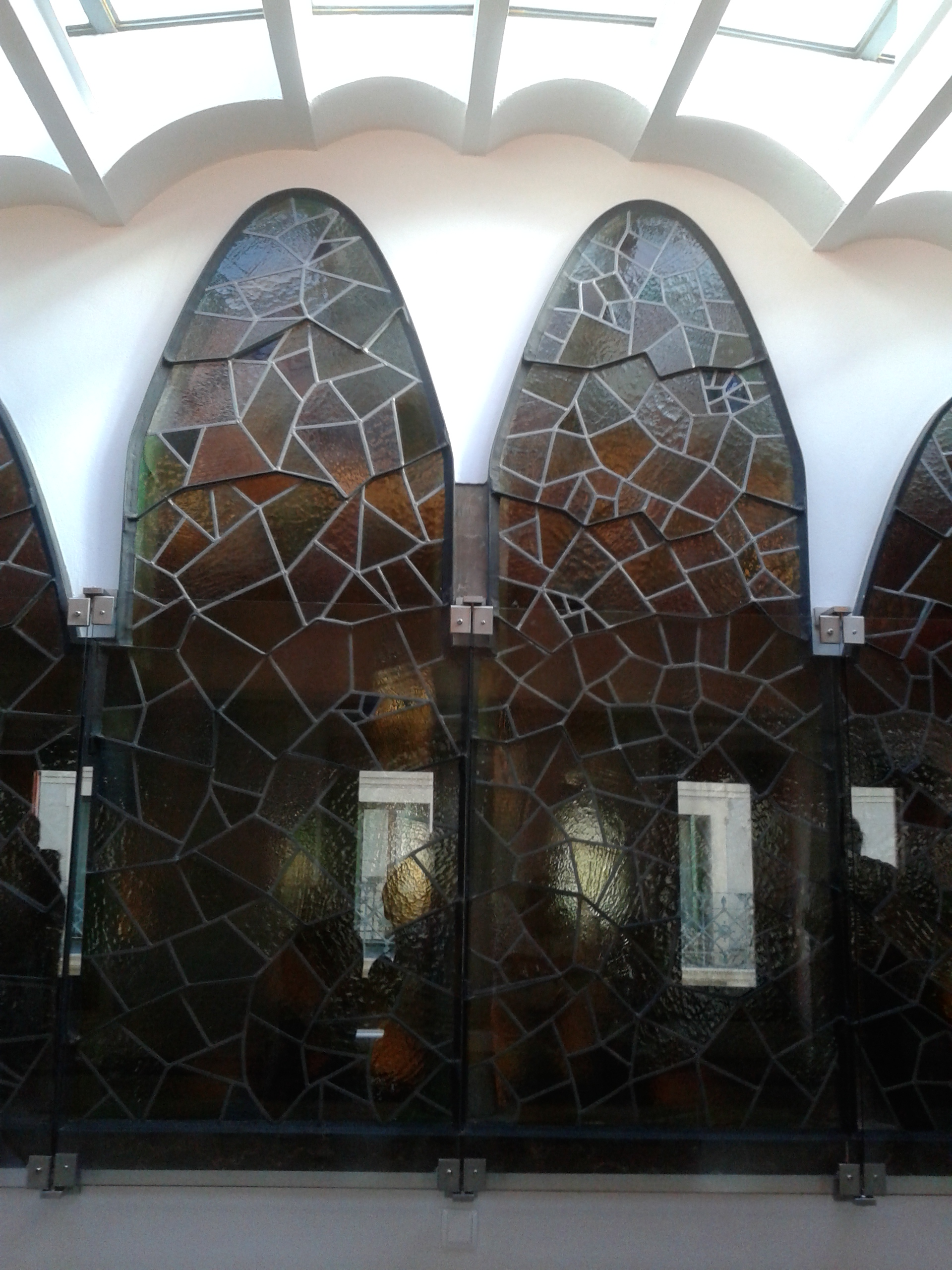
Palau Güell: Parabolic

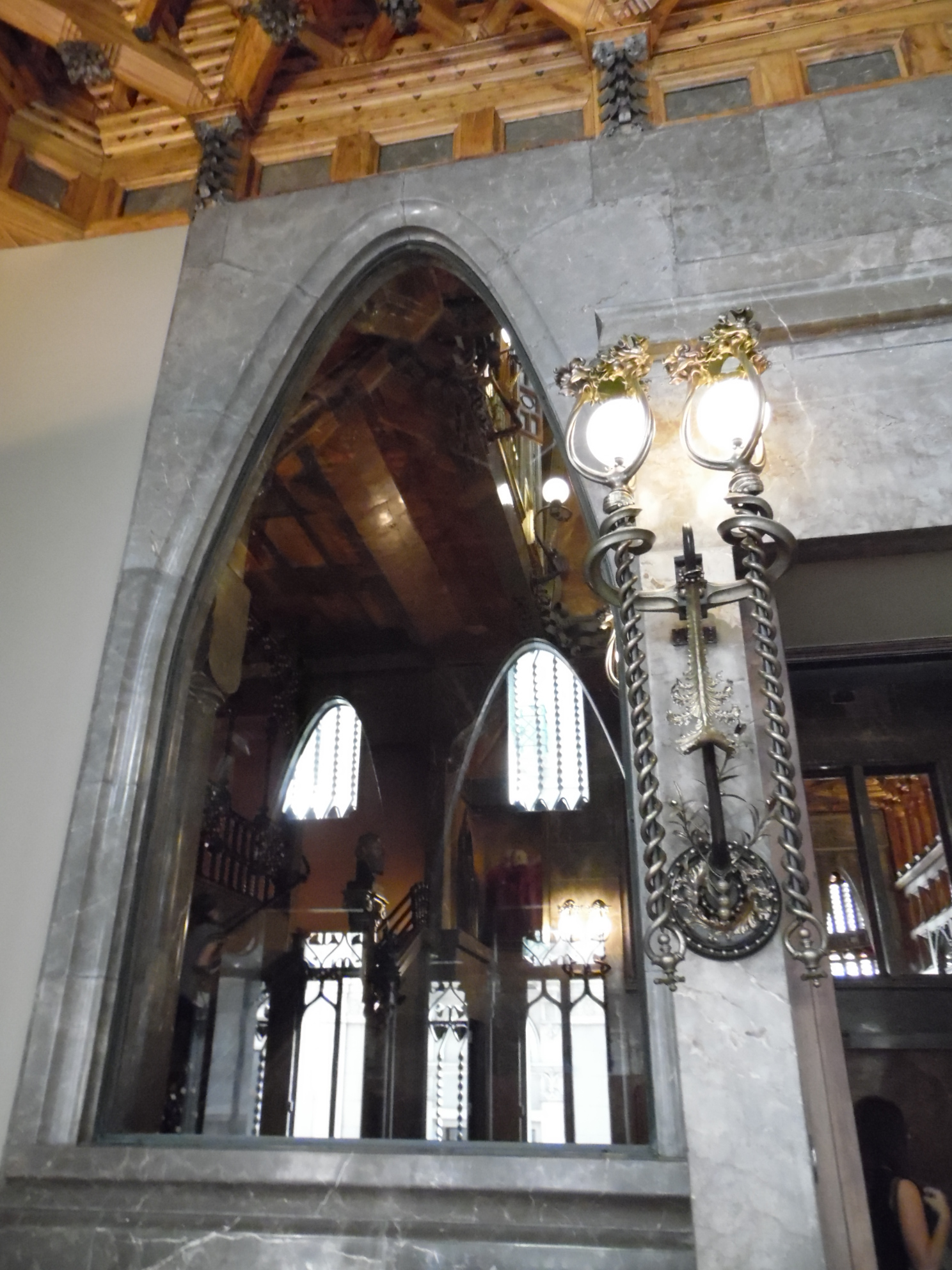
Palau Güell: Hyperbolic

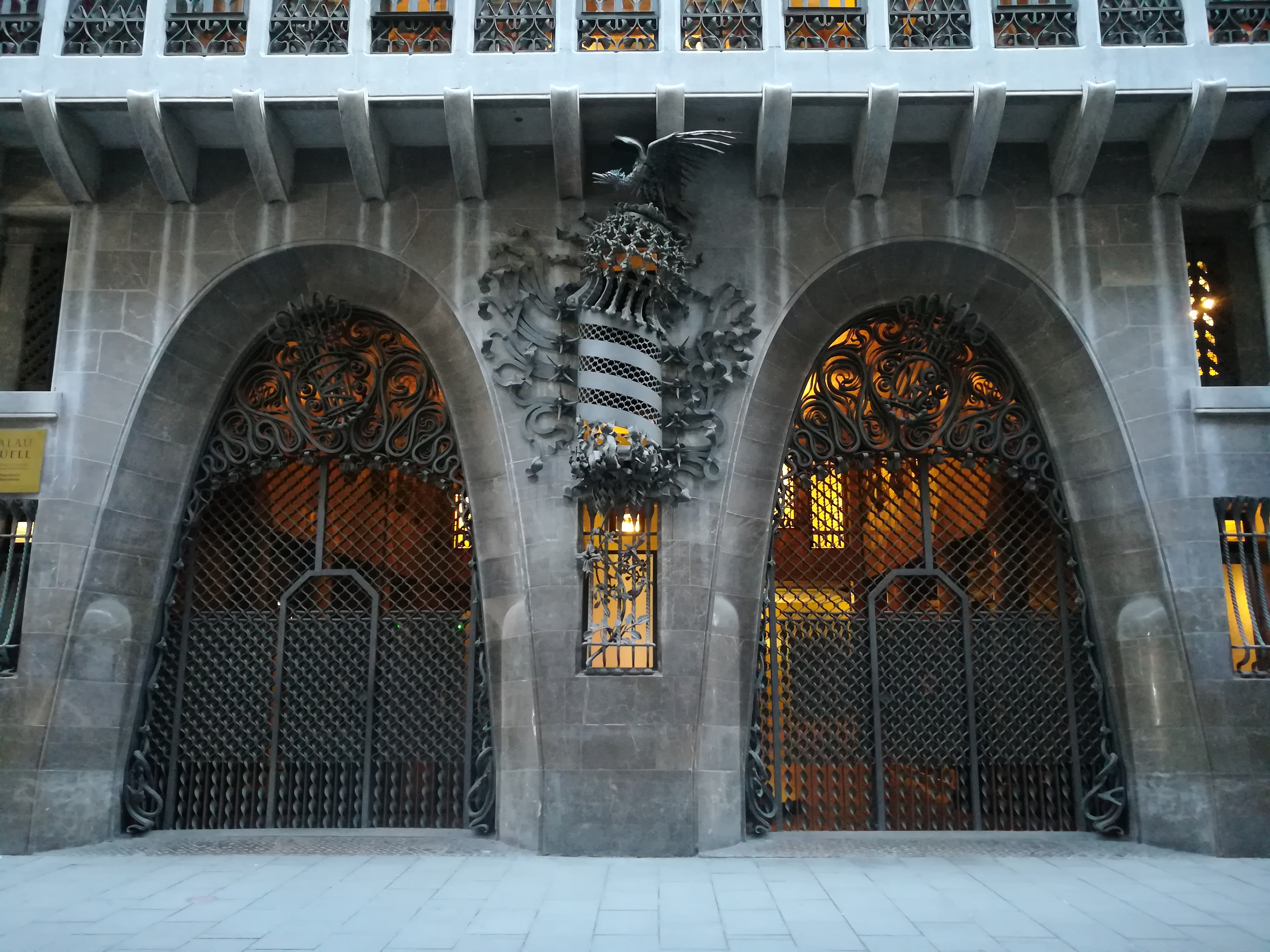
Palau Güell: Rankine curve (a.k.a. weighted catenary)

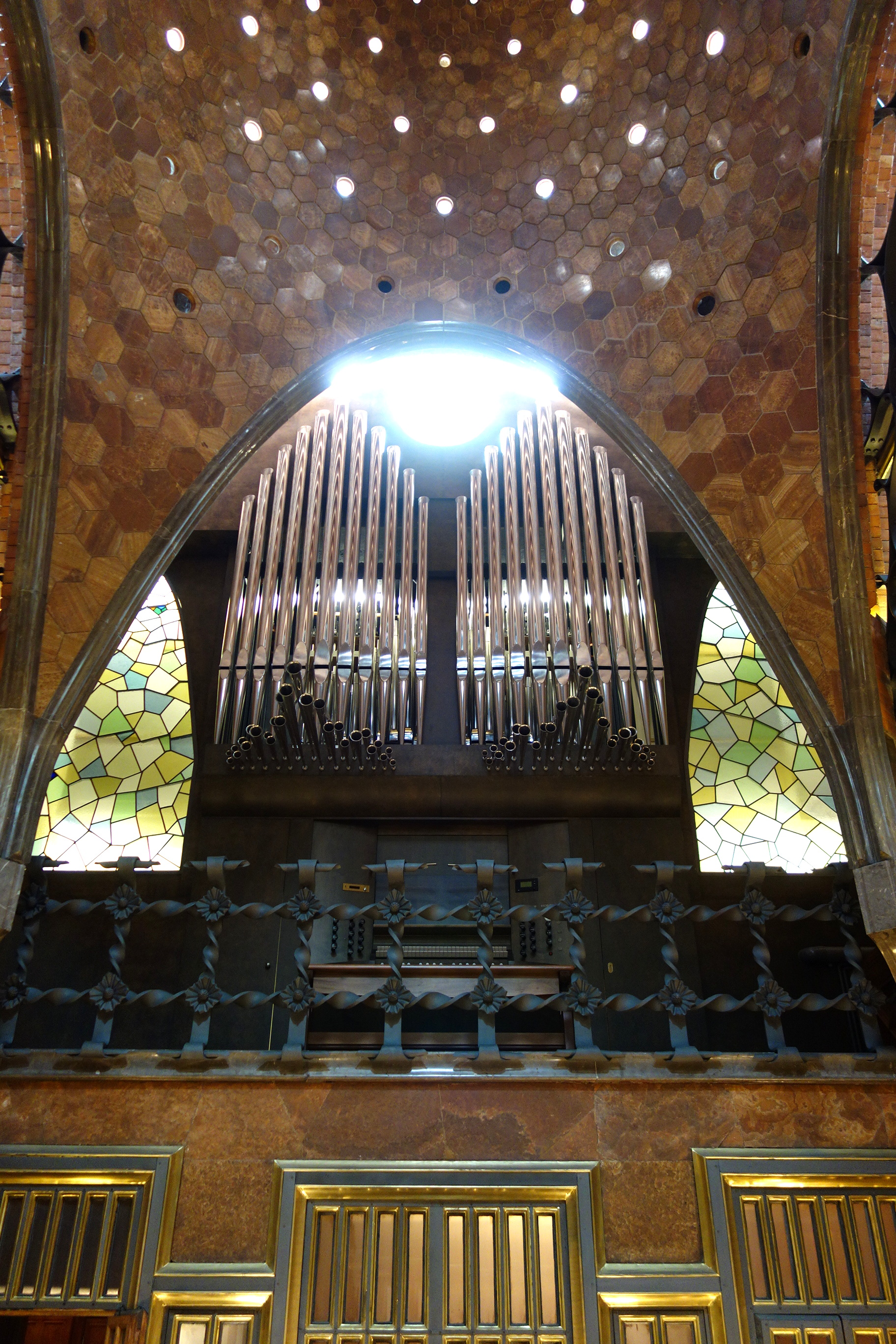
Palau Güell: Elliptical

Three parabolic-looking curves in particular are of significance to the arch design: parabola itself, catenary, and weighted catenary. The arches naturally use the inverted (upside-down) versions of these curves.

A parabola represents an ideal (all-compression) shape when the load is equally distributed along the span, while the weight of the arch itself is negligible. A catenary is the best solution for the case where an arch with uniform thickness carries just its own weight with no external load. The practical designs for bridges are somewhere in between, and thus use the curves that represent a compromise that combines both the catenary and the funicular curve for particular non-uniform distribution of load. The practical free-standing arches are stronger and thus heavier at the bottom, so a weighted catenary curve is utilized for them. The same curve also fits well an application where a bridge consists of an arch with a roadway of packed dirt above it, as the dead load increases with a distance from the center.

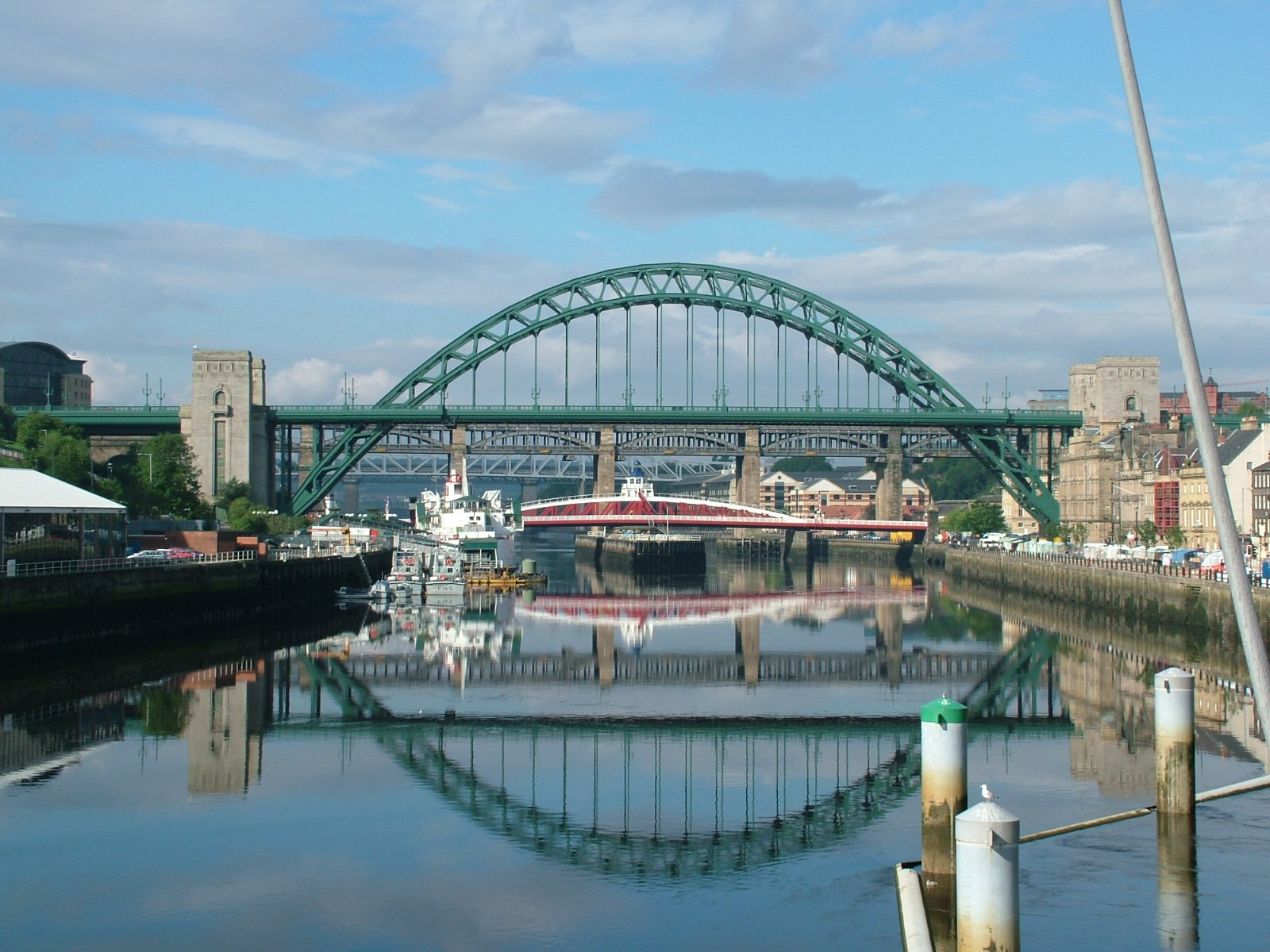
A through arch bridge (Tyne Bridge in Newcastle upon Tyne, England): parabolic-looking arches with multiple deck supports distributing the load

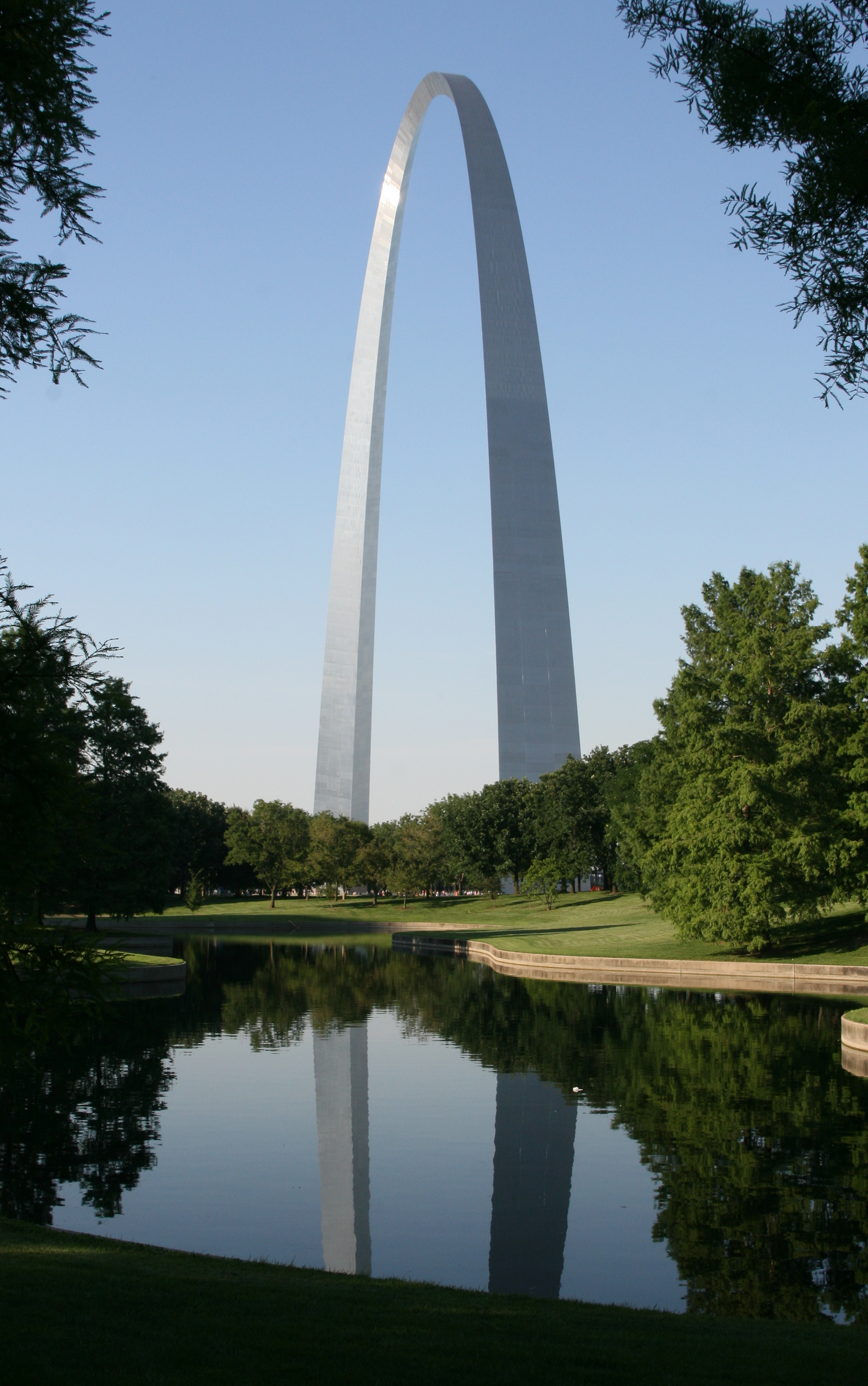
Gateway Arch is stronger at the bottom: weighted catenary curve

=== Other ===
Unlike regular arches, the flat arch (also known as jack arch, lintel arch, straight arch, plate-bande) is not curved. Instead, the arch is flat in profile and can be used under the same circumstances as lintel. However, lintels are subject to bending stress, while the flat arches are true arches, composed of irregular voussoir shapes (the keystone is the only one of the symmetric wedge shape), and that efficiently uses the compressive strength of the masonry in the same manner as a curved arch and thus requires a mass of masonry on both sides to absorb the considerable lateral thrust. Used in the Roman architecture to imitate the Greek lintels, Islamic architecture, European medieval and Renaissance architecture. The flat arch is still being used as a decorative pattern, primarily at the top of window openings.

==== False arches ====
In a corbel (also corbelled) arch, each course projects farther into the opening than the one below, so that the opposing stacks of corbels eventually meet. The resulting structure bears weight without forming a true arch. Most have a triangular outline, but curved ones occur at Delhi's Quwwat-ul-Islam Mosque (1198). The technique also occurs in Egyptian, Mycenaean, and Maya architecture.

Like a corbel arch, the triangular arch is not a true arch in a structural sense. Its intrados is formed by two slabs leaning against each other. Brick builders would call triangular any arch with straight inclined sides. The design was common in Anglo-Saxon England until the late 11th century (St Mary Coslany). Mayan corbel arches are sometimes called triangular due to their shape.

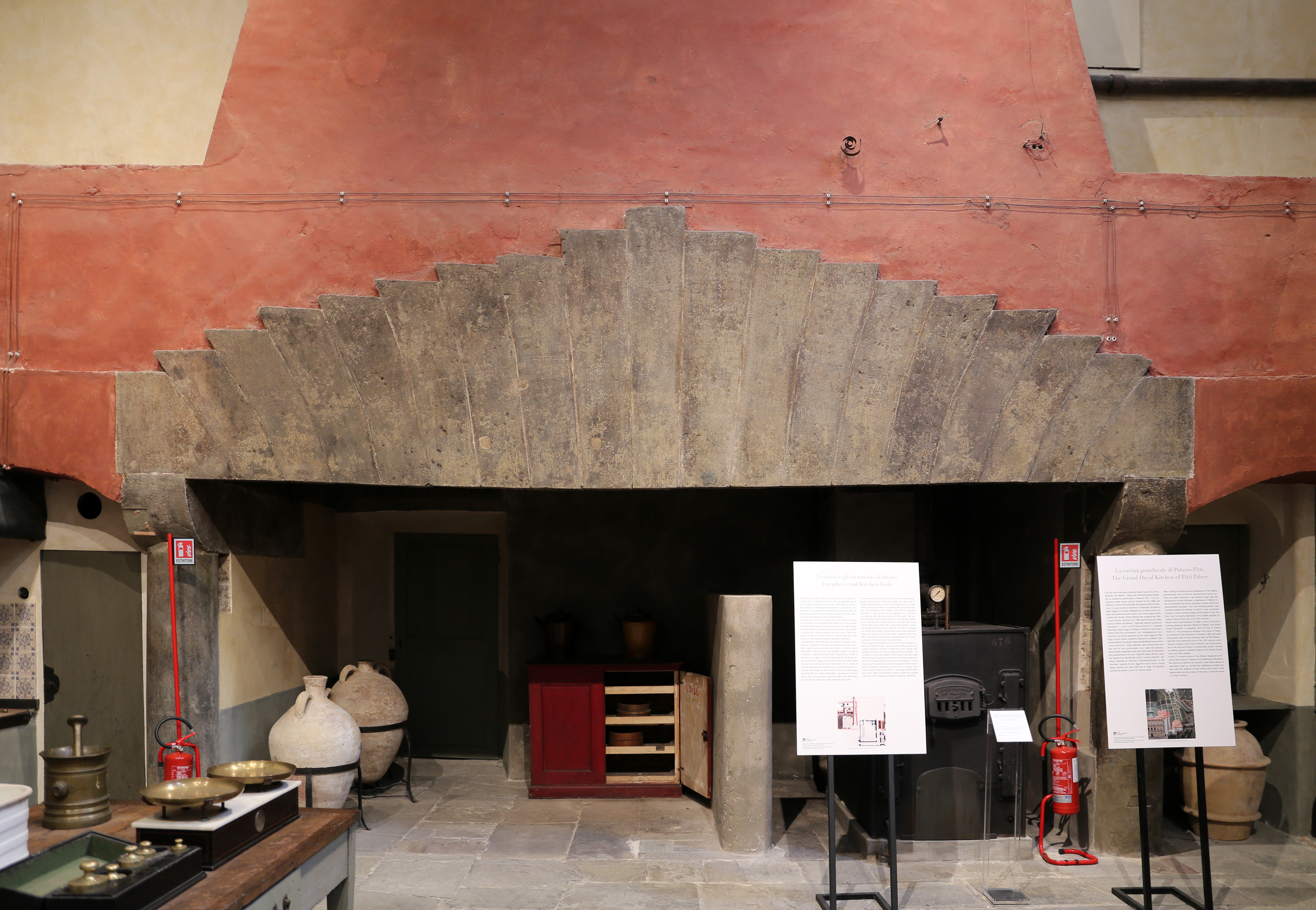
Flat arch in the kitchen of Pitti Palace

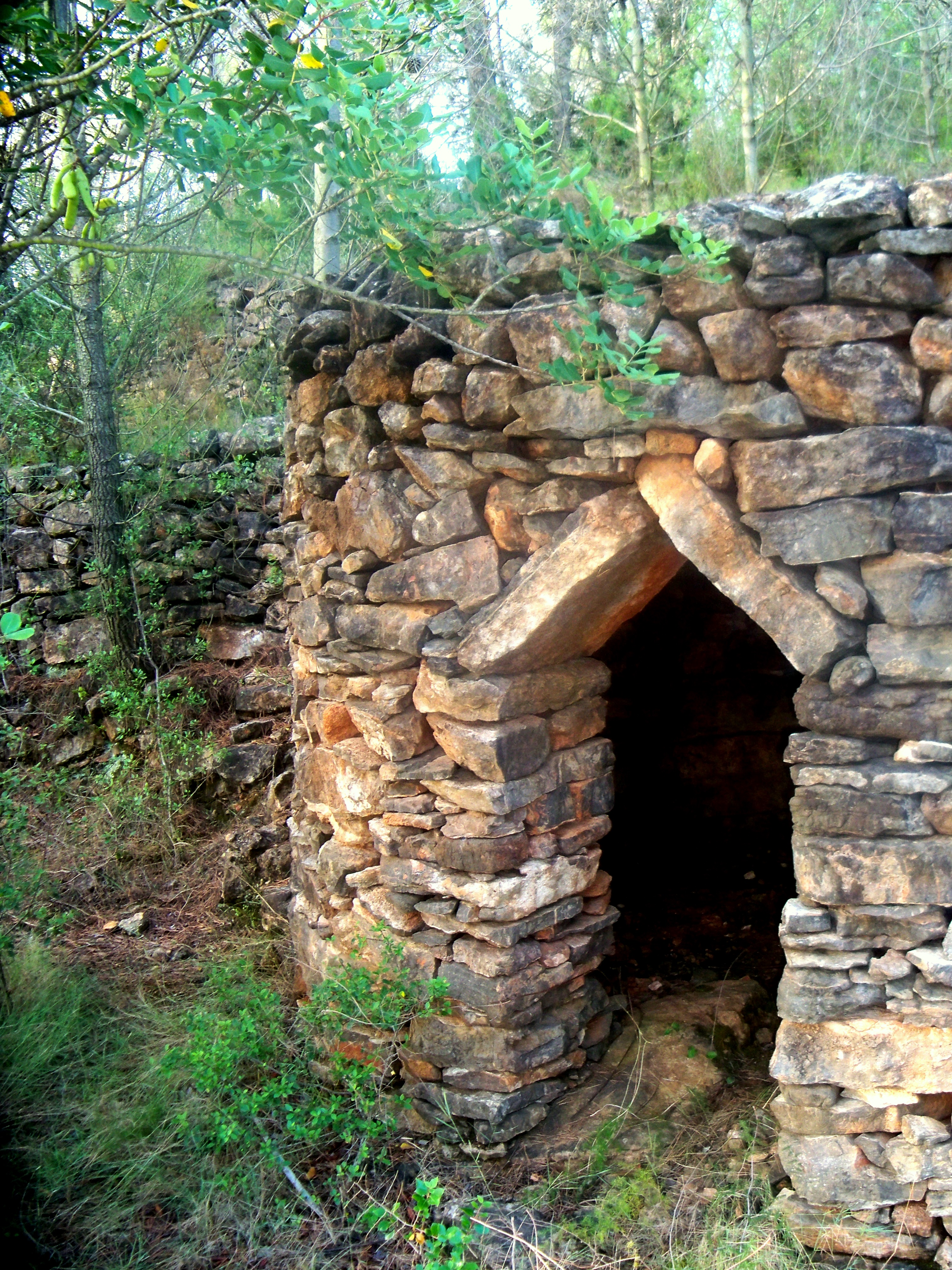
Triangular arch

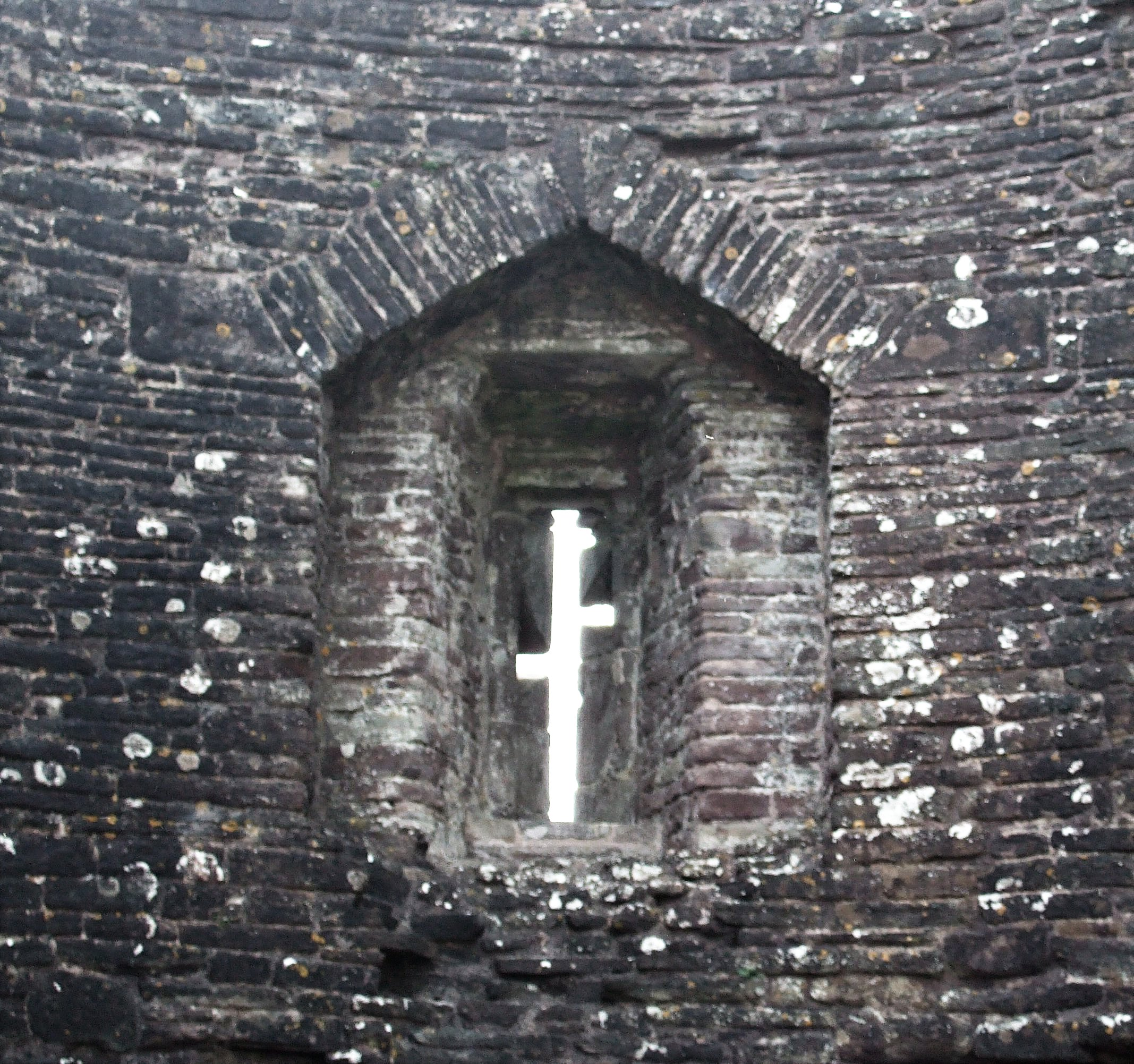
A triangular arch built using masonry

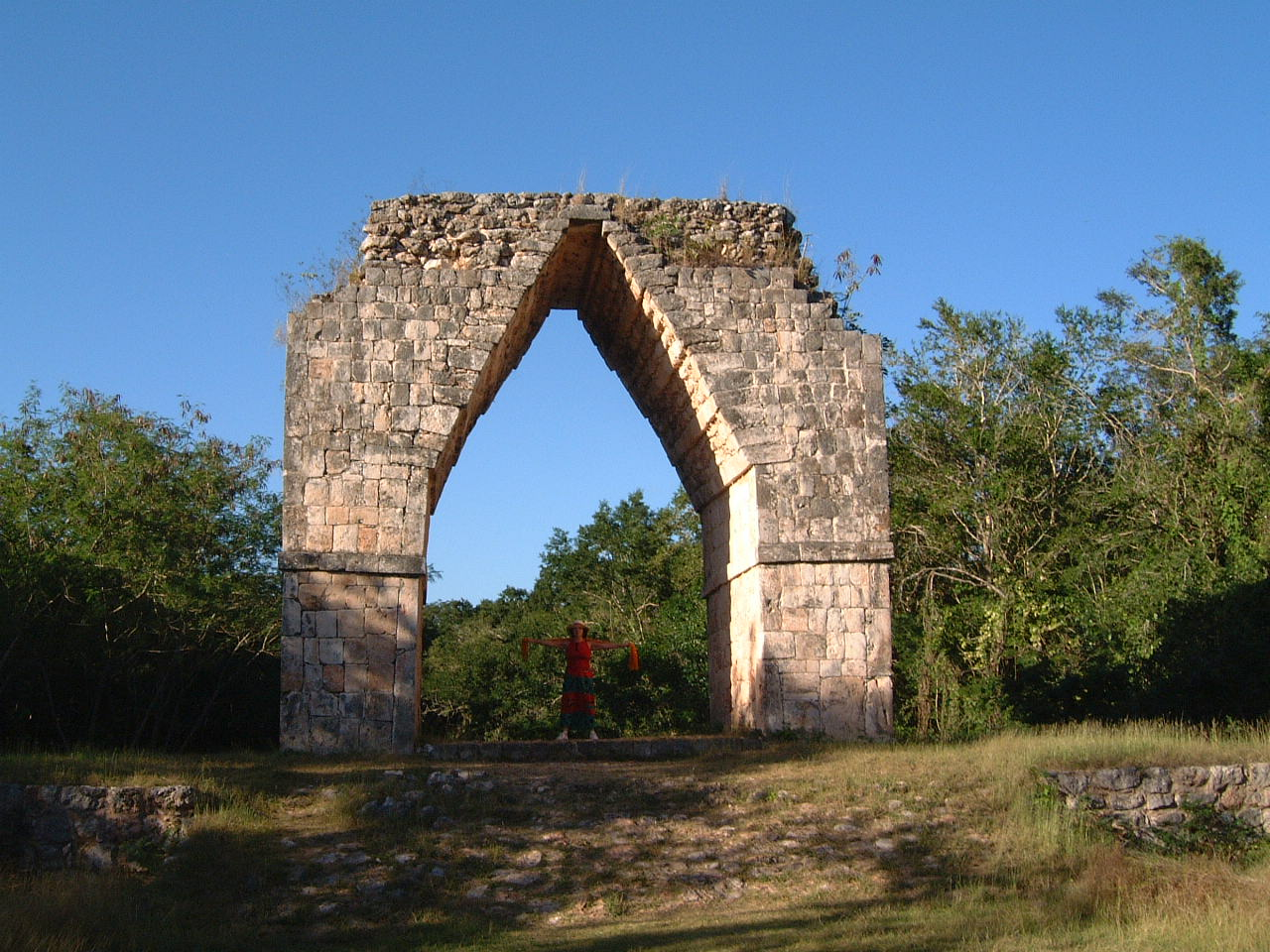
Mayan corbelled arch

=== Variations ===
Few transformations can be applied to arch shapes.

If one impost is much higher than another, the arch (frequently pointed) is known as ramping arch, raking arch, or rampant arch (from French: arc rampant). Ramping arches were used to support inclined structures such as stairs, and in the 13th and 14th centuries formed parts of flying buttresses that counteracted the thrust of Gothic ribbed vaults. Where Gothic flying buttresses were built in several tiers, upper arches could also carry roof drainage away from the aisles and resist wind forces. An earlier example is found in the aisles of Vaison-la-Romaine Cathedral (around 1100), where ramping arches braced the Romanesque building.

A central part of an arch can be raised on short vertical supports, creating a trefoil-like shouldered arch. The raised central part can vary all the way from a flat arch to ogee. Shouldered arches were used for doorways and other openings in medieval European and Late Gothic architecture. Examples in Iranian architecture date from the 12th and 13th centuries, preceding wider use during the 14th century. The outside arcades of the tomb of Öljaitü at Soltaniyeh illustrate this later popularity. Beyond Iran, the Green Mosque in Bursa (1424) provides an example in Ottoman architecture.

In a stilted arch (also surmounted), the springing line is located above the imposts (on "stilts"). Known to Islamic architects by the 8th century, the technique was utilized to vertically align the apexes of arches of different dimensions in Romanesque and Gothic architecture. Stilting was useful for semicircular arches, where the ratio of the rise fixed at 1/2 of the span, but was applied to the pointed arches, too.

The skew arch (also known as an oblique arch) is used when the arch needs to form an oblique angle in the horizontal plane with respect to the (parallel) springings, for example, when a bridge crosses the river at an angle different than 90°. A splayed arch is used for the case of unequal spans on the sides of the arch (when, for example, an interior opening in the wall is larger than the exterior one), the intrados of a round splayed arch is not cylindrical, but has a conical shape.

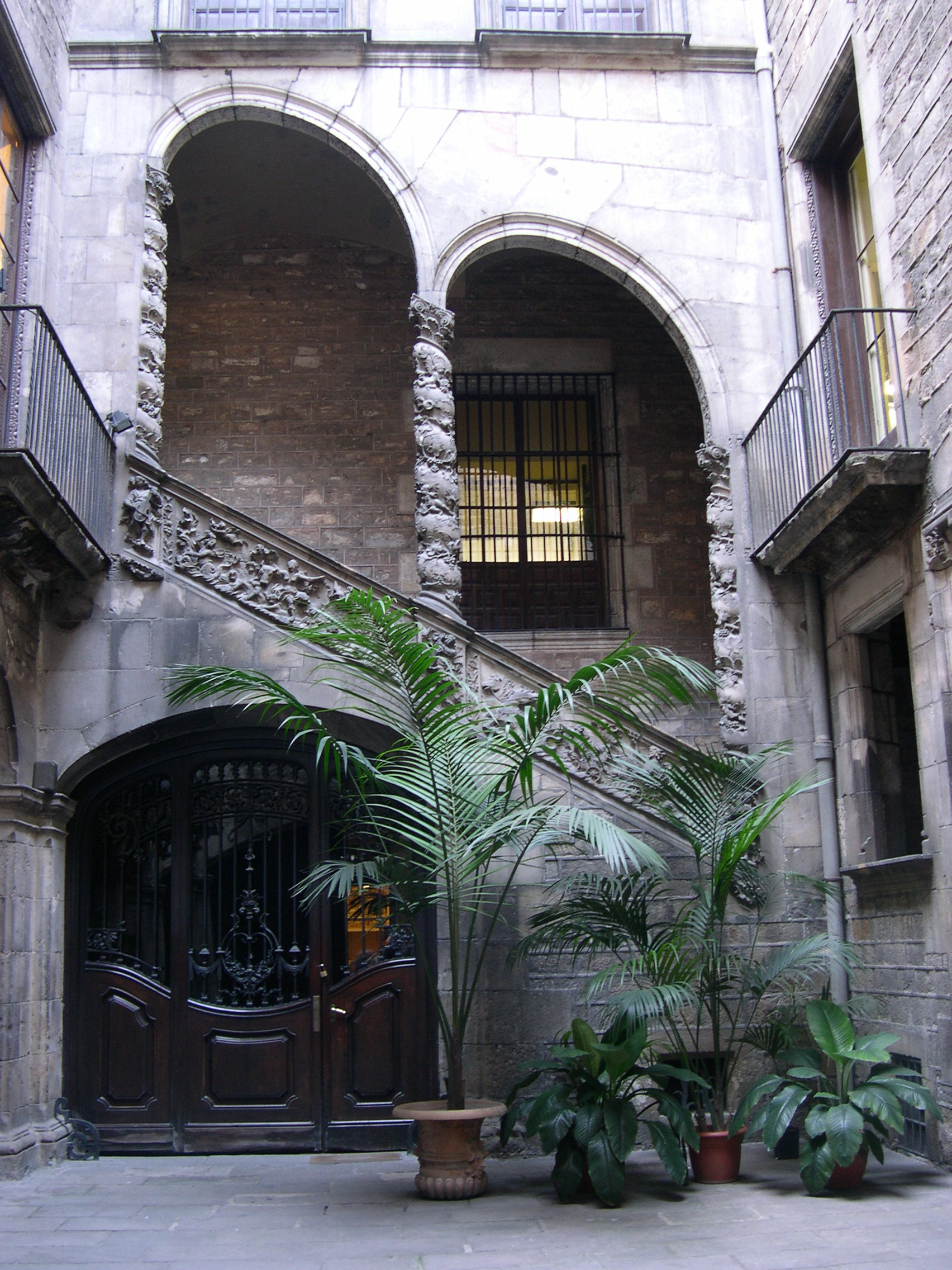
Ramping arches at Palau Dalmases in Barcelona

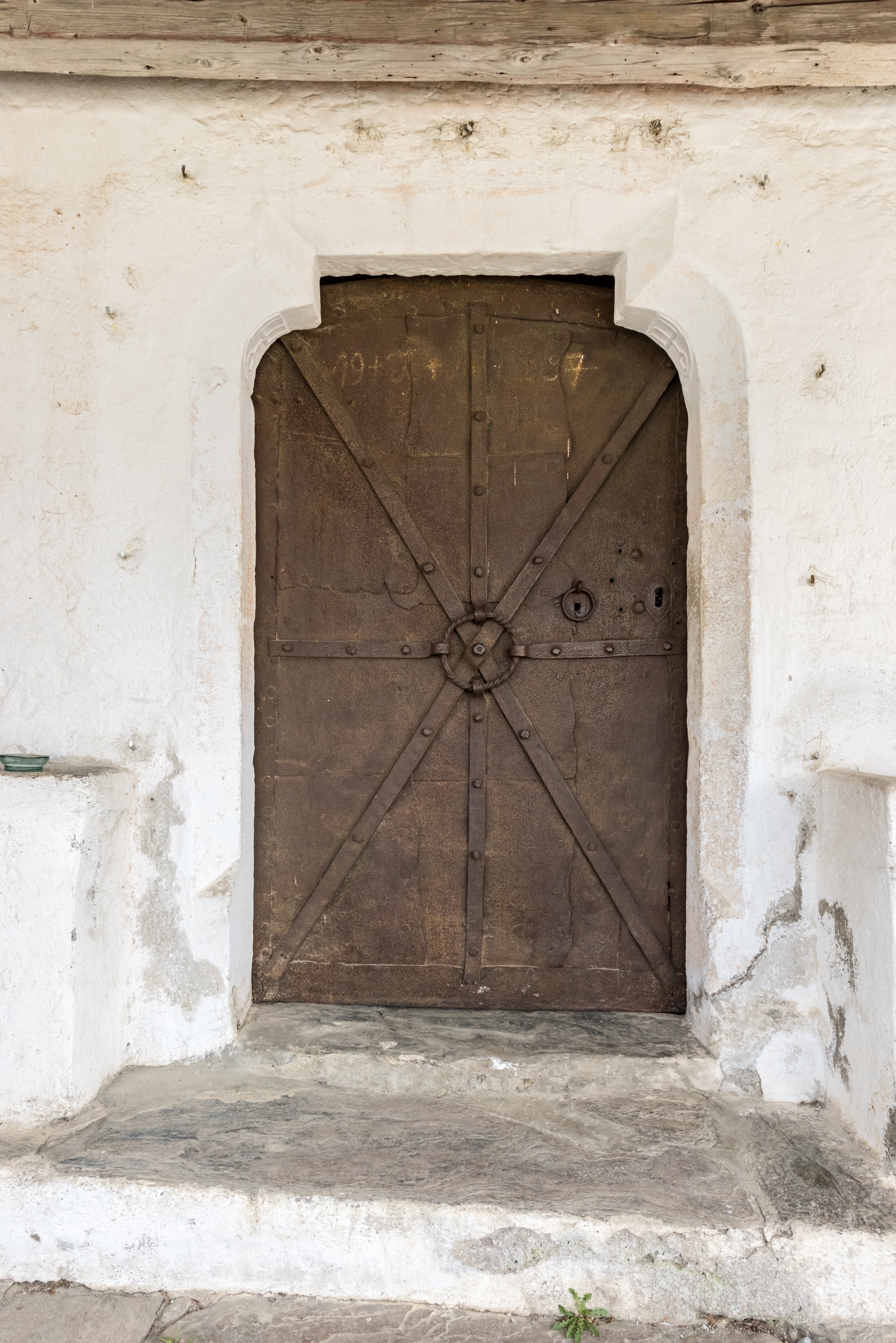
Shouldered arch around the door of Lorenziberg church. The raised portion is a flat arch.

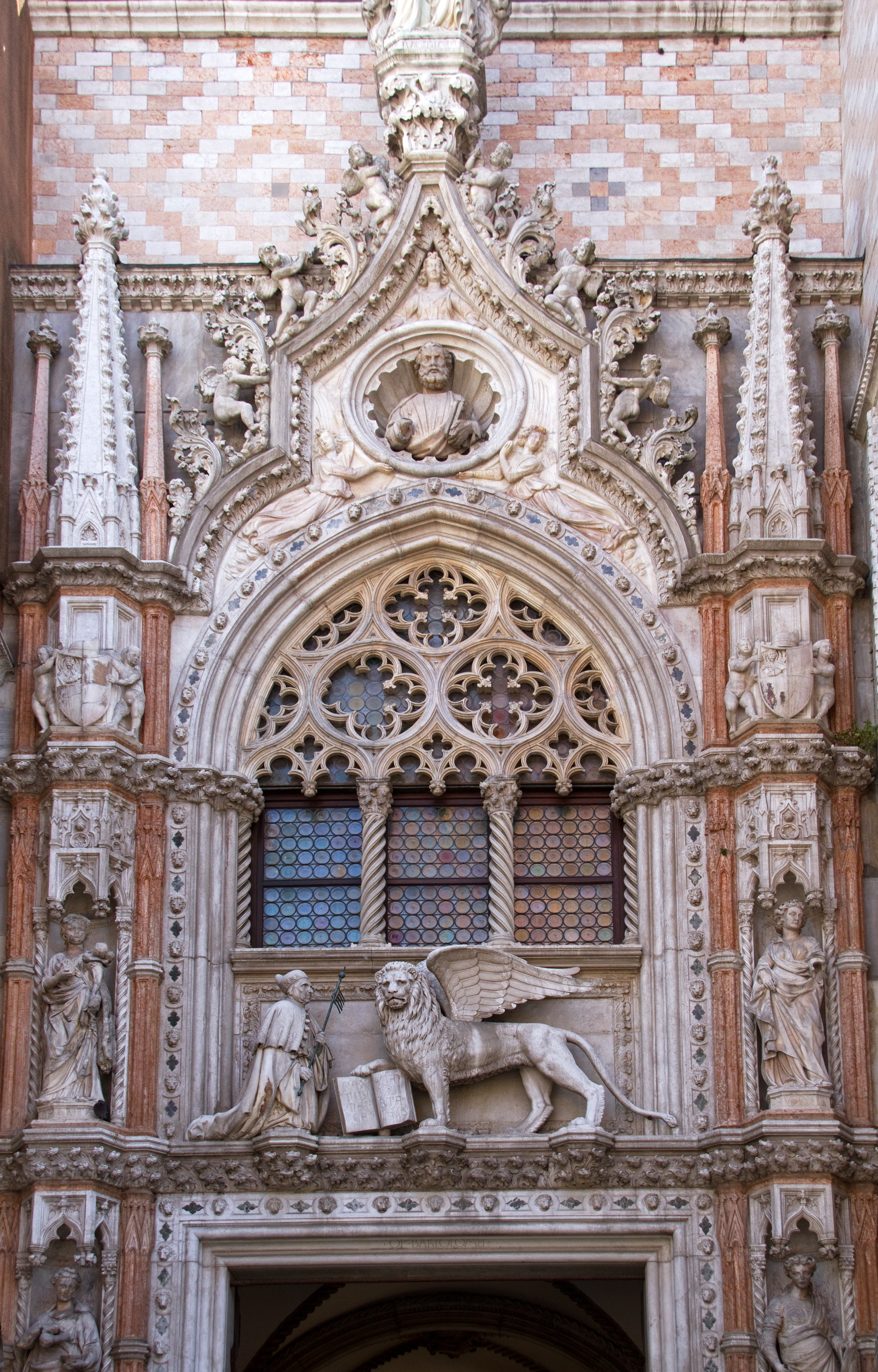
Shouldered arch above the main entrance of Doge's Palace in Venice. The vertical supports separate the segments of an ogee arch.

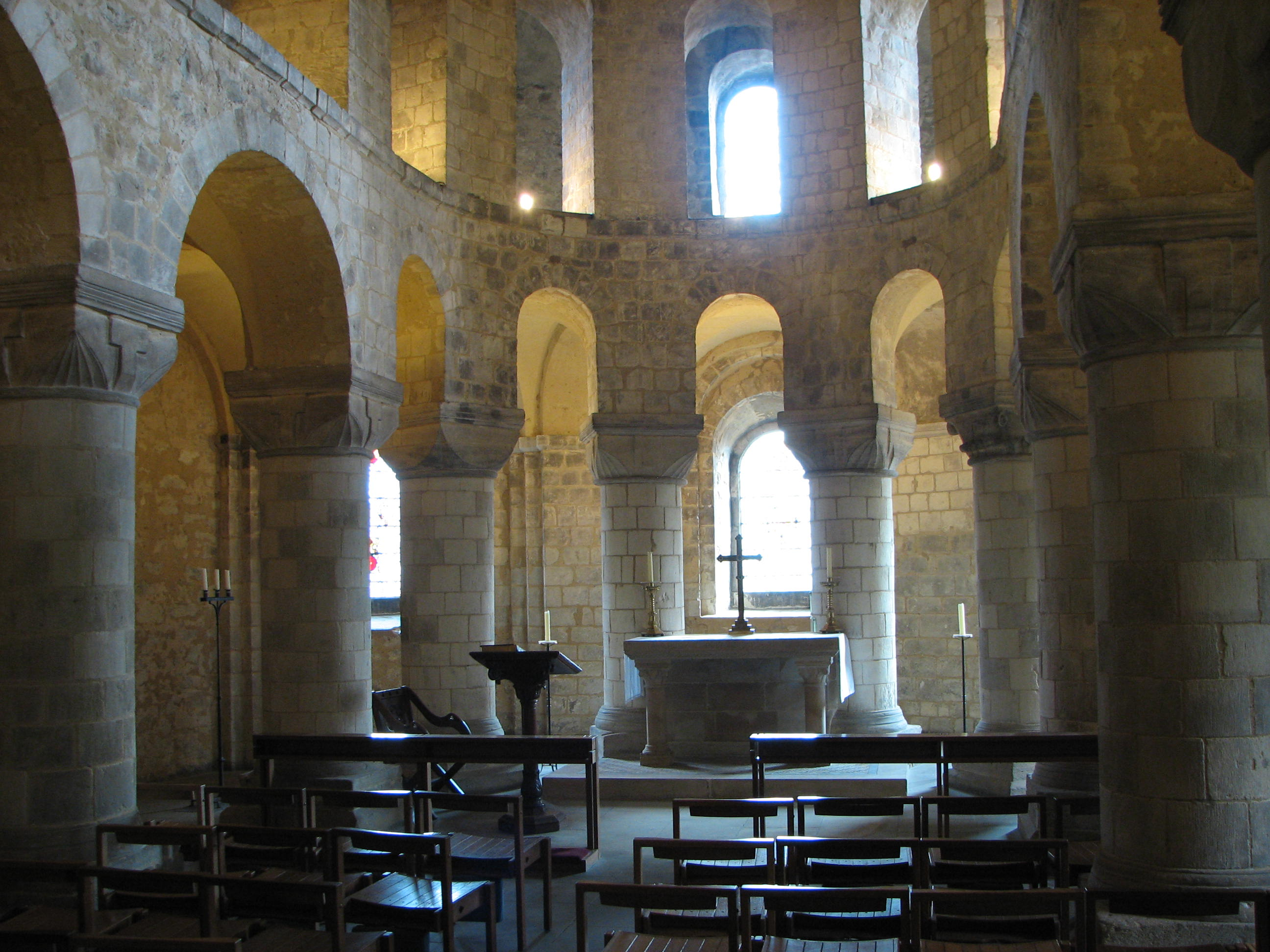
The smaller arches at the lower level are stilted to match the wider arches on the left (St John's Chapel, London)

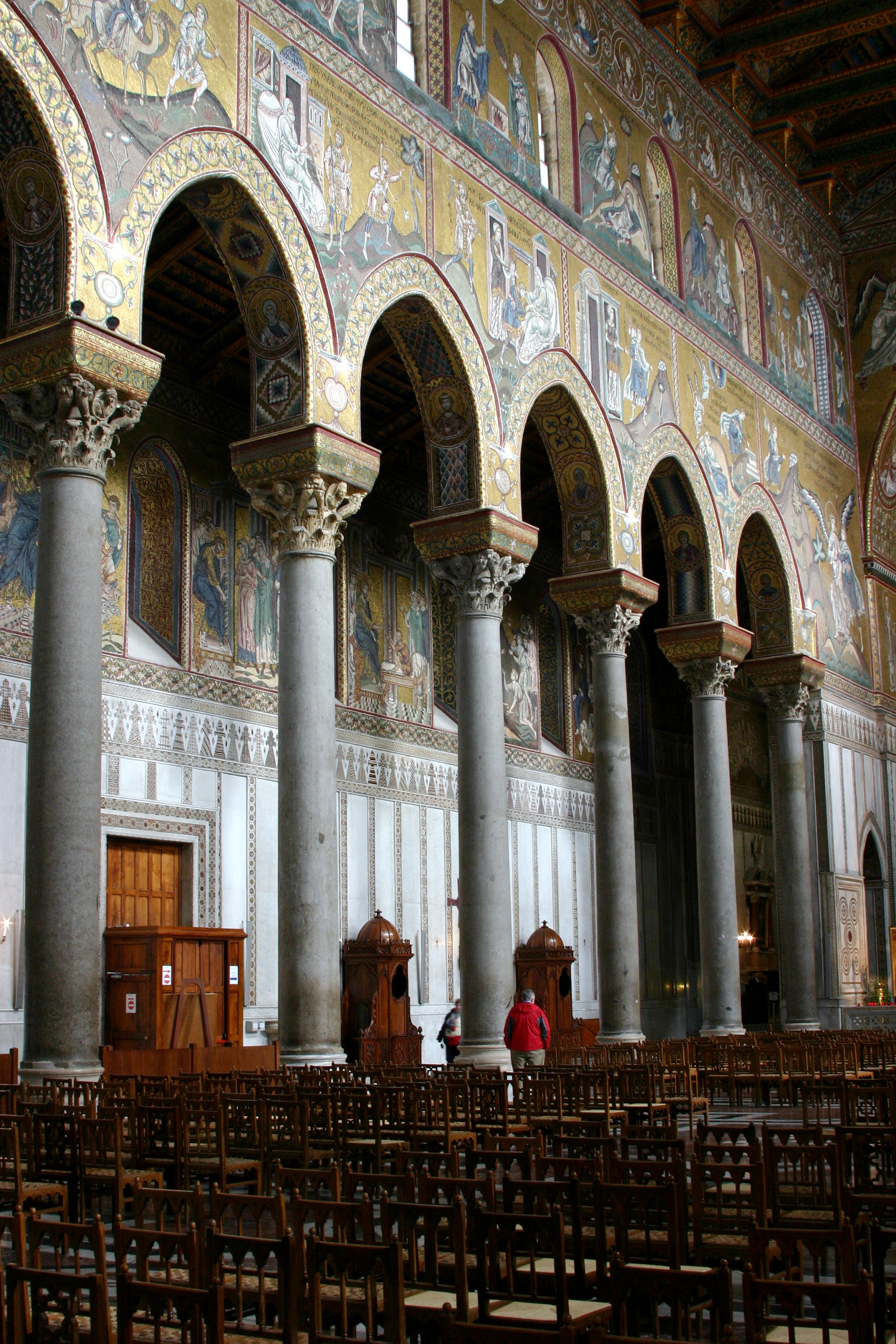
Stilted pointed arches at the Monreale Cathedral)

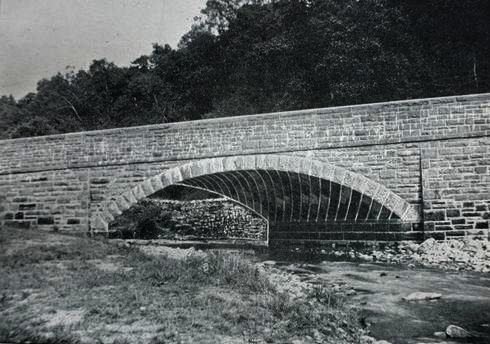
Skew arch (Sickergill Bridge) with helicoidal masonry courses

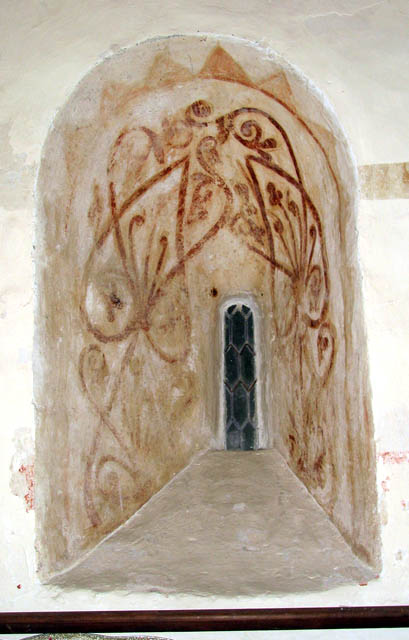
Splayed arch over a window opening in the All Saints Church in Chedgrave

A wide arch with its rise less than 1/2 of the span (and thus the geometric circle of at least one segment is below the springing line) is called a surbased arch (sometimes also a depressed arch). A drop arch is either a basket handle arch or a blunt arch.

== Hinged arches ==
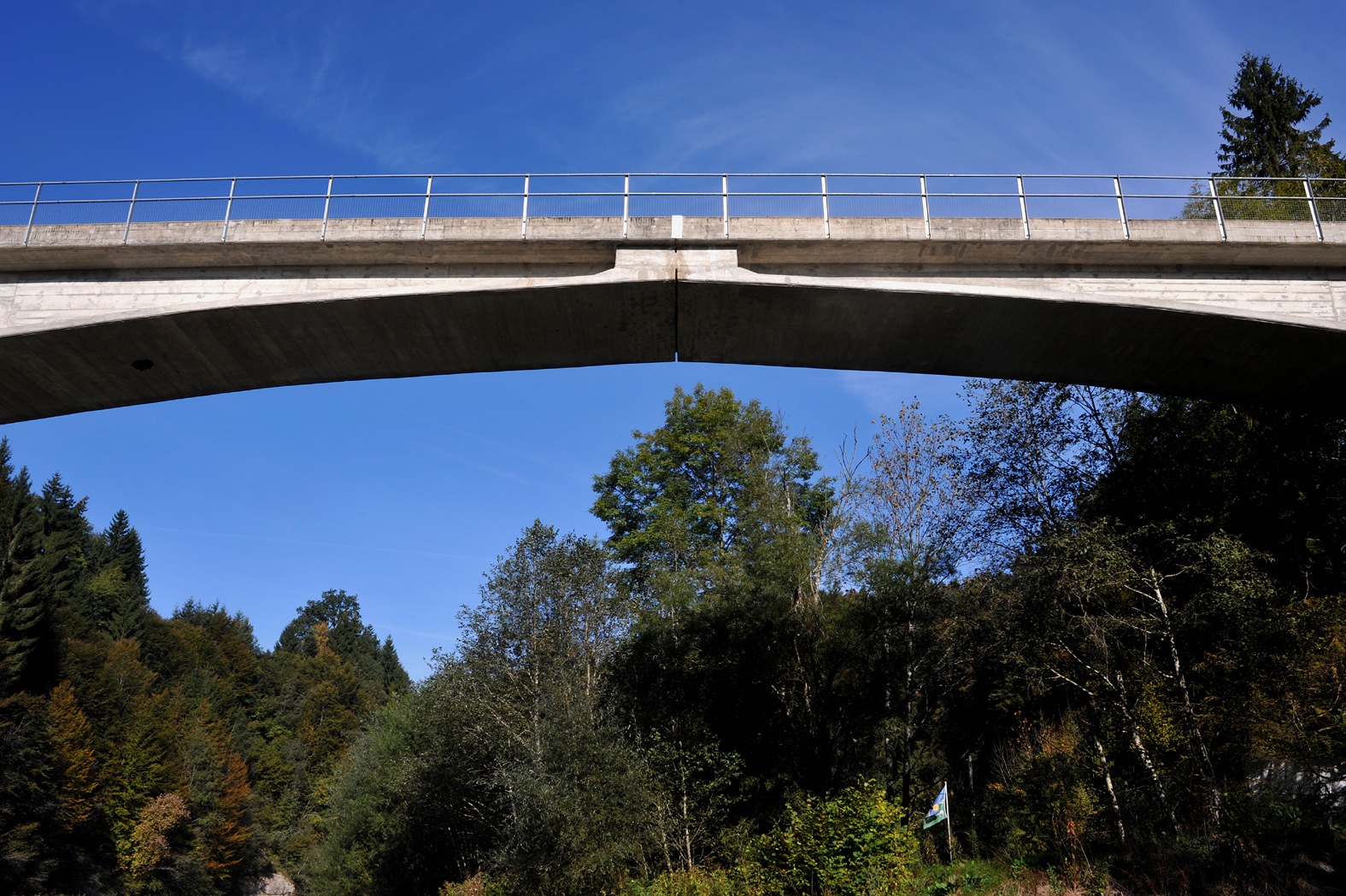
Rossgraben bridge (Rüeggisberg) near Bern, Switzerland, showing the hinge at mid-span of this three-hinged arch.

Practical arch bridges are built either as a fixed arch, a two-hinged arch, or a three-hinged arch. The fixed arch is most often used in reinforced concrete bridges and tunnels, which have short spans. Because it is subject to additional internal stress from thermal expansion and contraction, this kind of arch is statically indeterminate (the internal state is impossible to determine based on the external forces alone).

The two-hinged arch is most often used to bridge long spans. This kind of arch has pinned connections at its base. Unlike that of the fixed arch, the pinned base can rotate, thus allowing the structure to move freely and compensate for the thermal expansion and contraction that changes in outdoor temperature cause. However, this can result in additional stresses, and therefore the two-hinged arch is also statically indeterminate, although not as much as the fixed arch.

The three-hinged arch is not only hinged at its base, like the two-hinged arch, yet also at its apex. The additional apical connection allows the three-hinged arch to move in two opposite directions and compensate for any expansion and contraction. This kind of arch is thus not subject to additional stress from thermal change. Unlike the other two kinds of arch, the three-hinged arch is therefore statically determinate. It is most often used for spans of medial length, such as those of roofs of large buildings. Another advantage of the three-hinged arch is that the reaction of the pinned bases is more predictable than the one for the fixed arch, allowing shallow, bearing-type foundations in spans of medial length. In the three-hinged arch "thermal expansion and contraction of the arch will cause vertical movements at the peak pin joint but will have no appreciable effect on the bases," which further simplifies foundational design.

== History ==
The arch became popular in the Roman times. In much of the world introduction of the true arch was a result of European influence, although it was known and occasionally used much earlier. Many ancient architectures avoided the use of arches, including the Viking and Hindu ones.

=== Bronze Age: ancient Near East ===
True arches, as opposed to corbel arches, were known by a number of civilizations in the ancient Near East including the Levant, but their use was infrequent and mostly confined to underground structures, such as drains where the problem of lateral thrust is greatly diminished. An example of the latter would be the Nippur arch, built before 3800 BC, and dated by H. V. Hilprecht (1859–1925) to even before 4000 BC. Rare exceptions are an arched mudbrick home doorway dated to c. 2000 BC from Tell Taya in Iraq and two Bronze Age arched Canaanite city gates, one at Ashkelon (dated to c. 1850 BC), and one at Tel Dan (dated to c. 1750 BC), both in modern-day Israel. An Elamite tomb dated 1500 BC from Haft Teppe contains a parabolic vault which is considered one of the earliest evidences of arches in Iran.

The use of true arches in Egypt also originated in the 4th millennium BC (underground barrel vaults at the Dendera cemetery). Standing arches were known since at least the Third Dynasty, but very few examples survived, since the arches were mostly used in non-durable secular buildings and made of mud brick voussoirs that were not wedge-shaped, but simply held in place by mortar, and thus susceptible to a collapse (the oldest arch still standing is at Ramesseum). Sacred buildings exhibited either lintel design or corbelled arches. Arches were mostly missing in Egypt temples even after the Roman conquest, even though Egyptians thought of the arch as a spiritual shape and used it in the rock-cut tombs and portable shrines. Auguste Mariette suggested that this choice was based on a relative fragility of a vault: "what would remain of the tombs and temples of Egyptians today, if they had preferred the vault?"

Mycenaean architecture utilized only the corbel arches in their beehive tombs with triangular openings. Mycenaeans had also built probably the oldest still standing stone-arch bridge in the world, Arkadiko Bridge, in Greece.

As evidenced by their imitations of the parabolic arches, Hittites most likely were exposed to the Egyptian designs, but used the corbelled technique to build them.

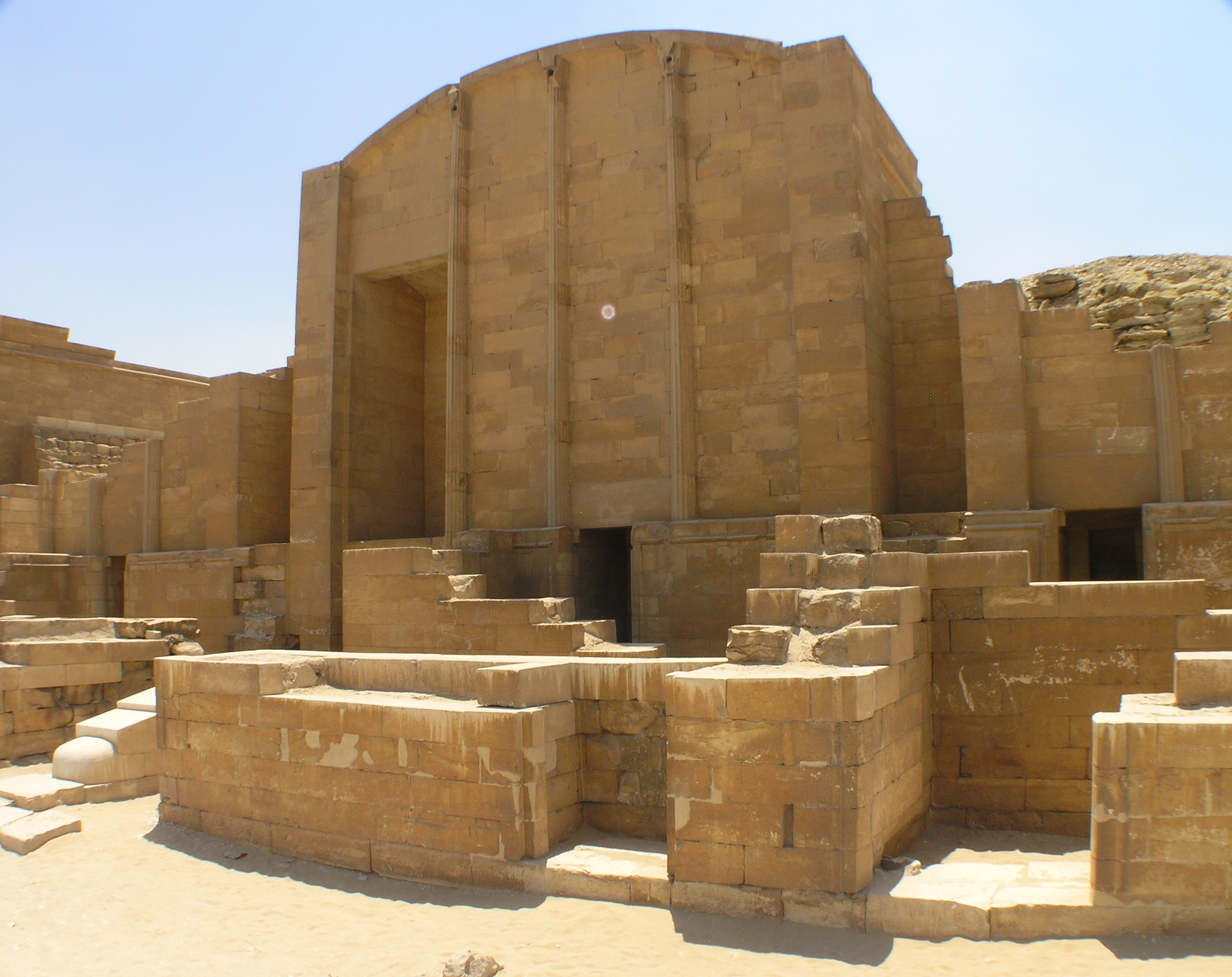
Vaulted building using a decorative segmented arch at the Heb-sed court in Saqqara (restored, c. 2650 BC)

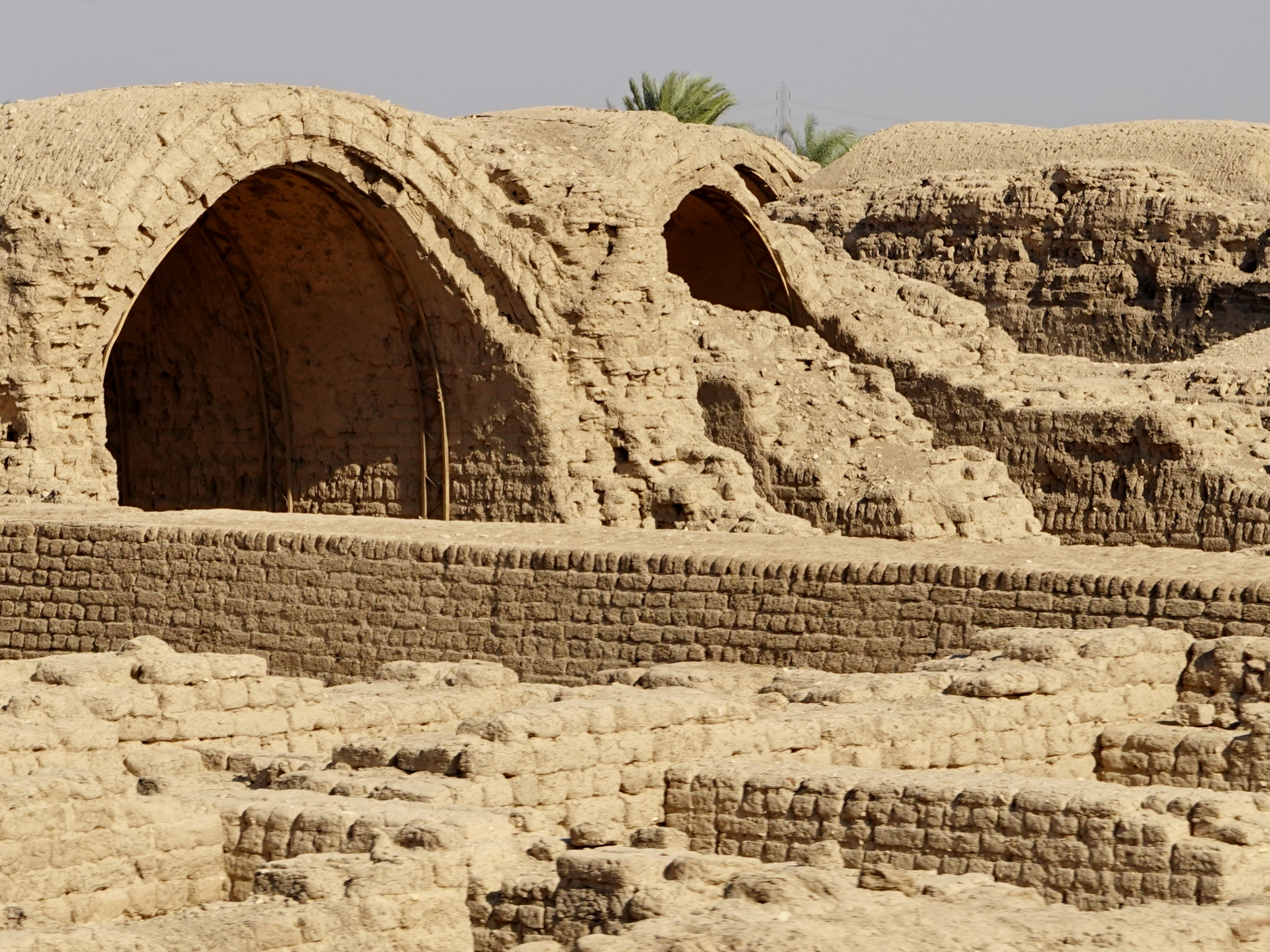
A true arch (catenary) at the Ramesseum granaries (c. 1300 BC)

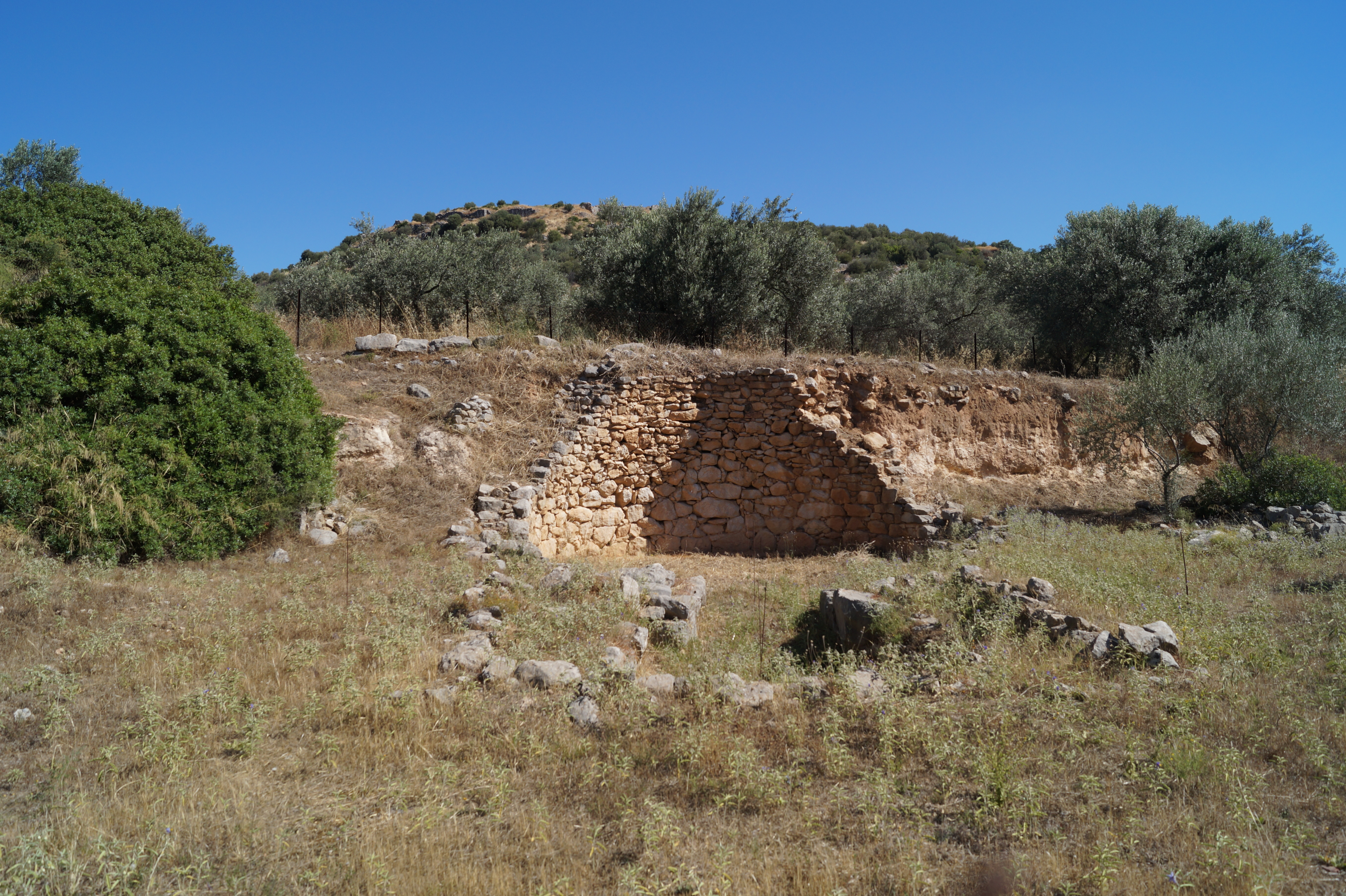
Ruins of the Kazarma tholos tomb (c.1500 BC) showing the Mycenaean beehive technique

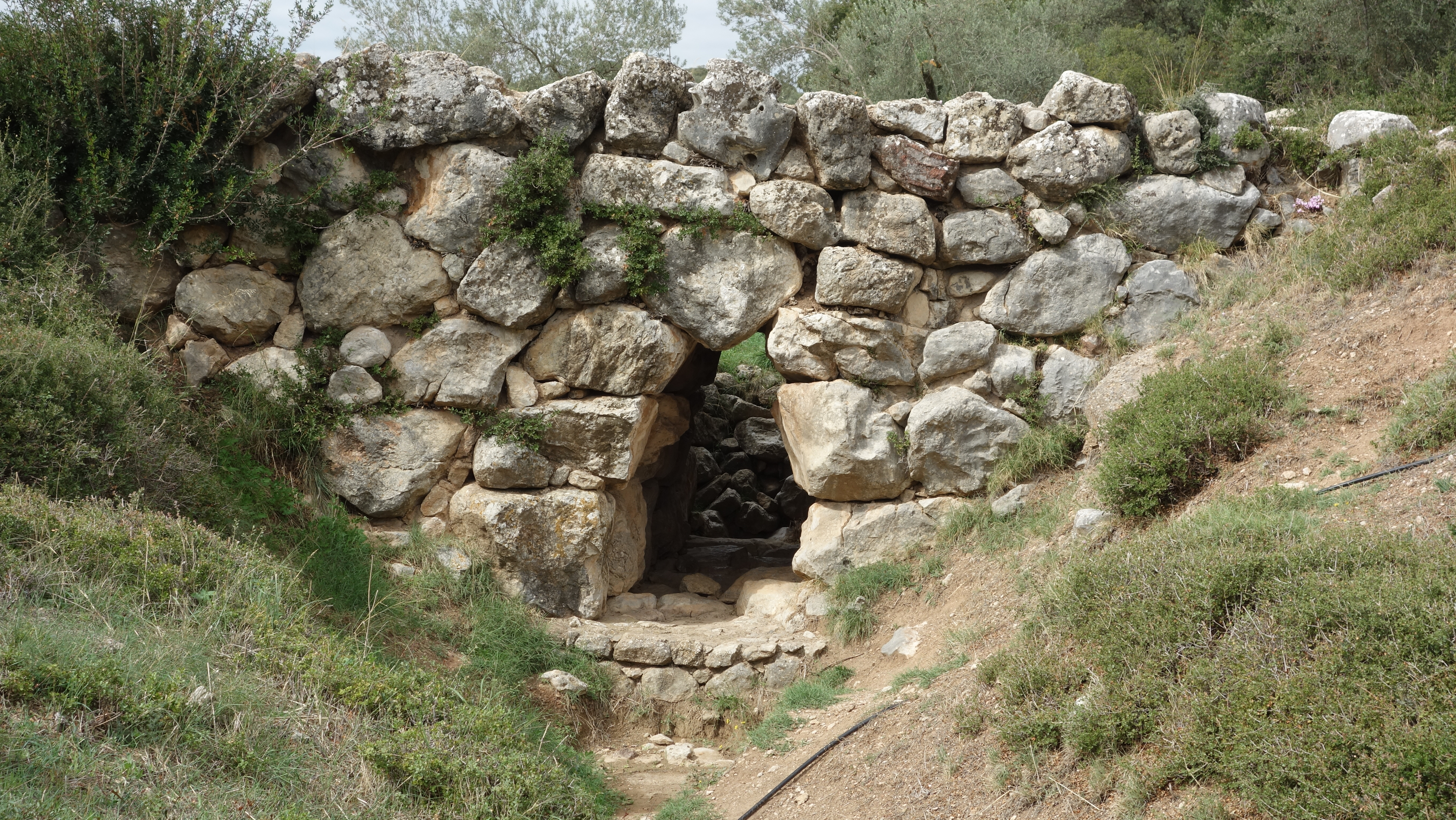
Arkadiko Bridge (c. 1300-1190 BC): corbel arch, cyclopean masonry

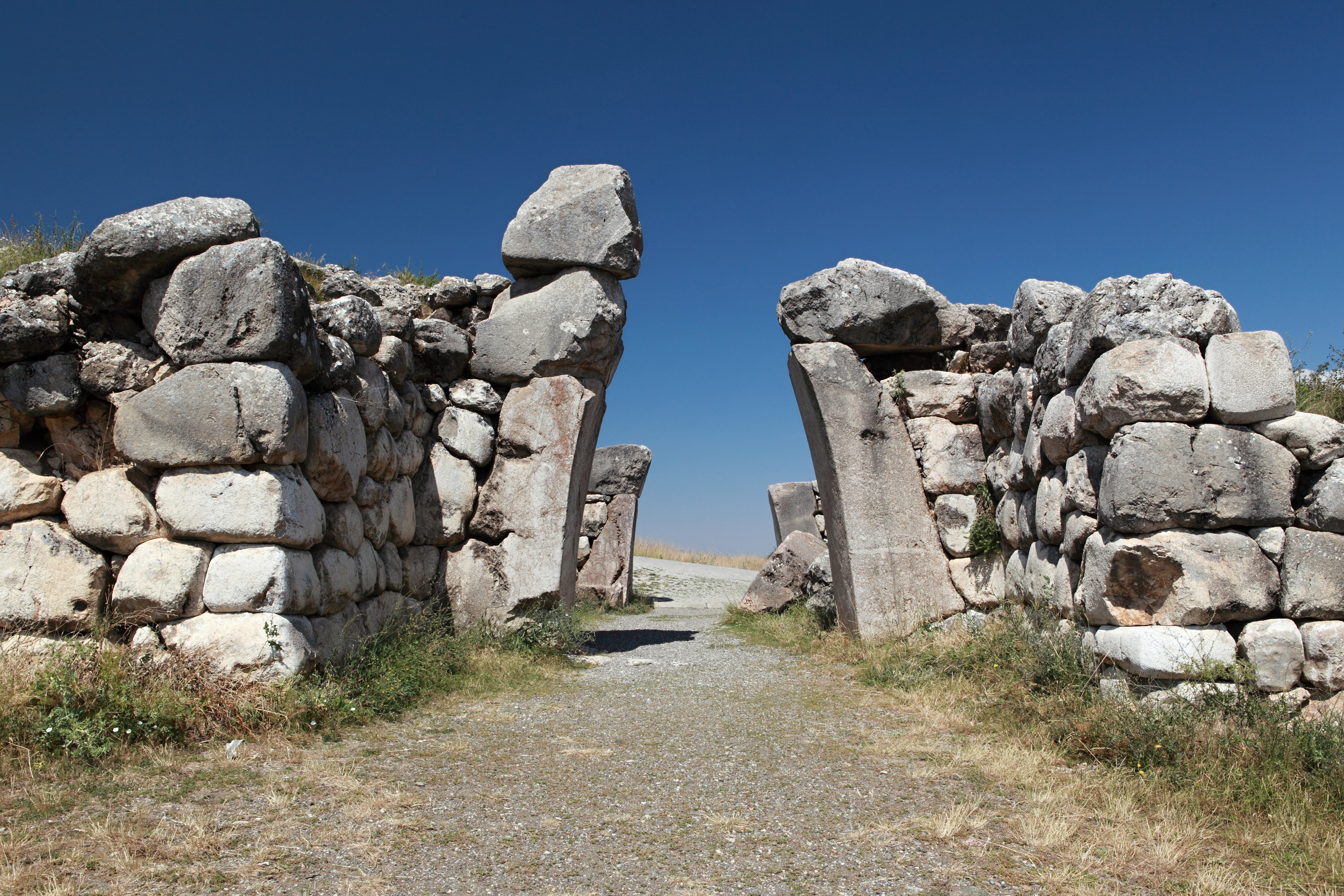
King's Gate (Hattusa)(c.1400-1200 BC), an imitation of the parabolic arch by Hittites

=== Classical Persia and Greece ===
The Assyrians, also apparently under the Egyptian influence, adopted the true arch (with a slightly pointed profile) early in the 8th century. In ancient Persia, the Achaemenid Empire (550 BC–330 BC) built small barrel vaults (essentially a series of arches built together to form a hall) known as iwan, which became massive, monumental structures during the later Parthian Empire (247 BC–AD 224). This architectural tradition was continued by the Sasanian Empire (224–651), which built the Taq Kasra at Ctesiphon in the 6th century AD, the largest free-standing vault until modern times.

An early European example of a voussoir arch appears in the 4th century BC Greek Rhodes Footbridge. The stairways of the temple of Apollo at Didyma pass beneath arches concealed within the building. At the stadium at Olympia and the agora at Priene, the entrance arches were left visible, as was acceptable in Greek secular construction.

Arch at the excavation in Dur-Sharrukin (Assyrian architecture, end of 8th century BC, photo taken in 1853)

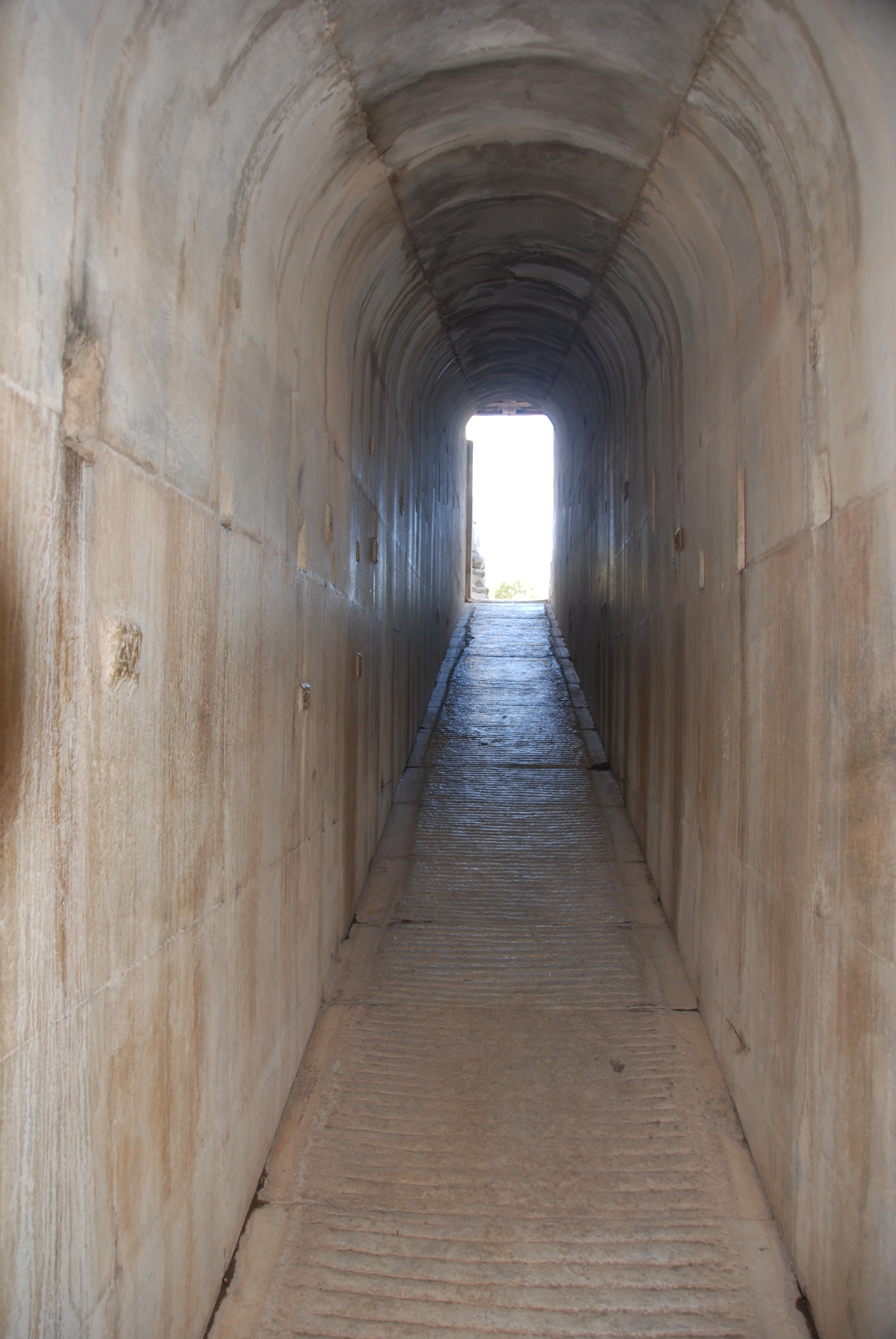
Vault underneath the temple of Apollo in Didyma, Turkey (4th century BC)

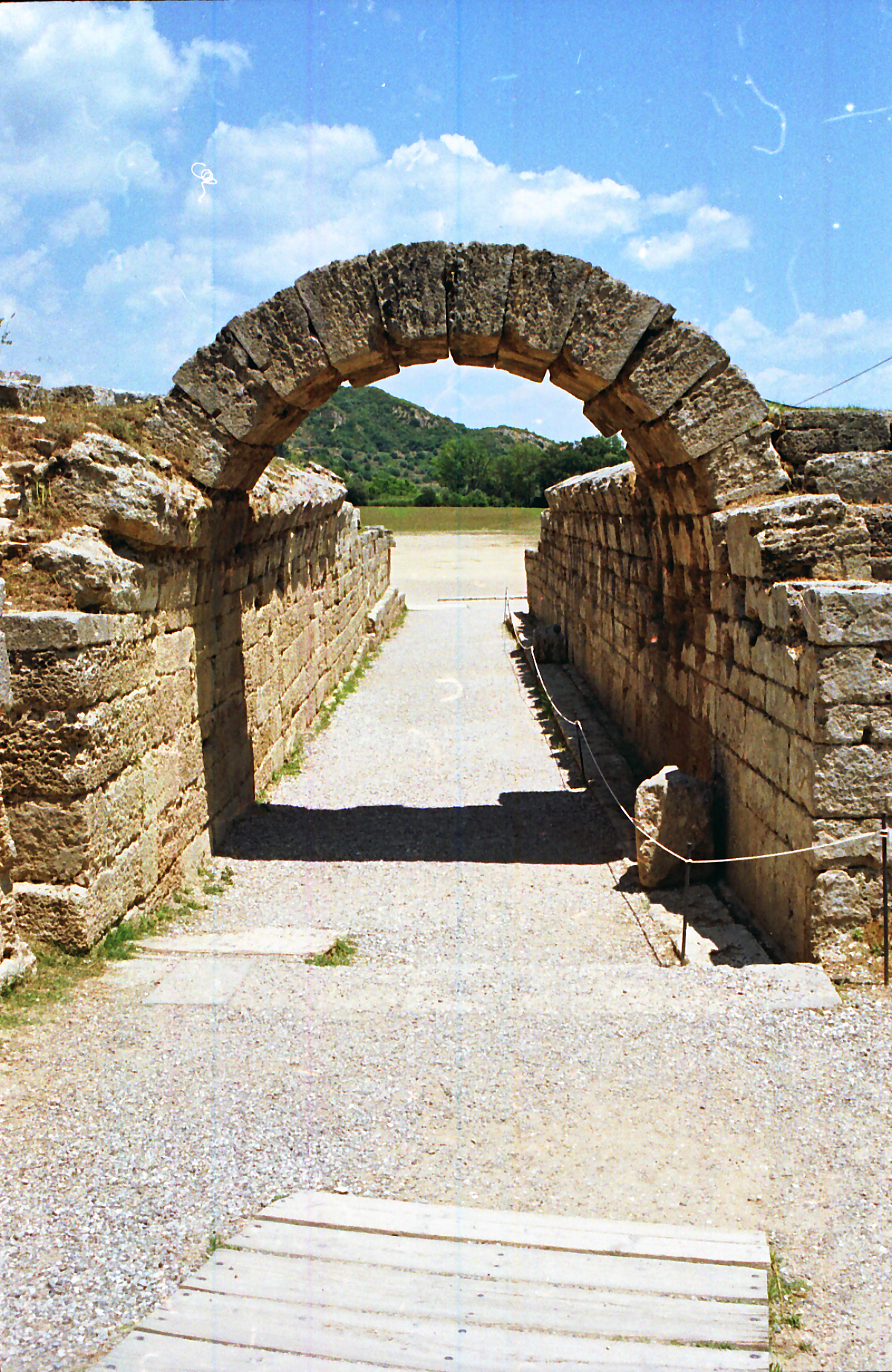
Arch at the stadium of Olympia (4th century BC)

=== Ancient Rome ===
The ancient Romans learned the semicircular arch from the Etruscans (both cultures apparently adopted the design in the 4th century BC), refined it and were the first builders in Europe to tap its full potential for above ground buildings:

The Romans were the first builders in Europe, perhaps the first in the world, to fully appreciate the advantages of the arch, the vault and the dome.

Throughout the Roman Empire, from Syria to Scotland, engineers erected arch structures. The first use of arches was for civic structures, like drains and city gates. Later the arches were utilized for major civic buildings bridges and aqueducts, with the outstanding 1st century AD examples provided by the Colosseum, Pont Du Gard, and the aqueduct of Segovia. The introduction of the ceremonial triumphal arch dates back to Roman Republic, although the best examples are from the imperial times (Arch of Augustus at Susa, Arch of Titus).

Romans initially avoided using the arch in the religious buildings and, in Rome, arched temples were quite rare until the recognition of Christianity in 313 AD (with the exceptions provided by the Pantheon and the "temple of Minerva Medica"). Away from the capital, arched temples were more common (temple of Hadrian at Ephesus, temple of Jupiter at Sbeitla, Severan temple at Djemila). Arrival of Christianity prompted creation of the new type of temple, a Christian basilica, that made a thorough break with the pagan tradition with arches as one of the main elements of the design, along with the exposed brick walls (Santa Sabina in Rome, Sant'Apollinare in Classe). From the late 5th century until the 20th, arcades were a standard element of both Eastern and Western Christian architecture.

Vaults began to be used for roofing large interior spaces such as halls and temples, a function that was also assumed by domed structures from the 1st century BC onwards.

The Romans used segmental arches in bridges such as Alconétar Bridge and Ponte San Lorenzo, recognizing that a bridge arch did not have to be a semicircle. The utilitarian and mass residential (insulae) buildings, as found in Ostia Antica and Pompeii, mostly used low segmental arches made of bricks and architraves made of wood, while the concrete lintel arches can be found in villas and palaces.

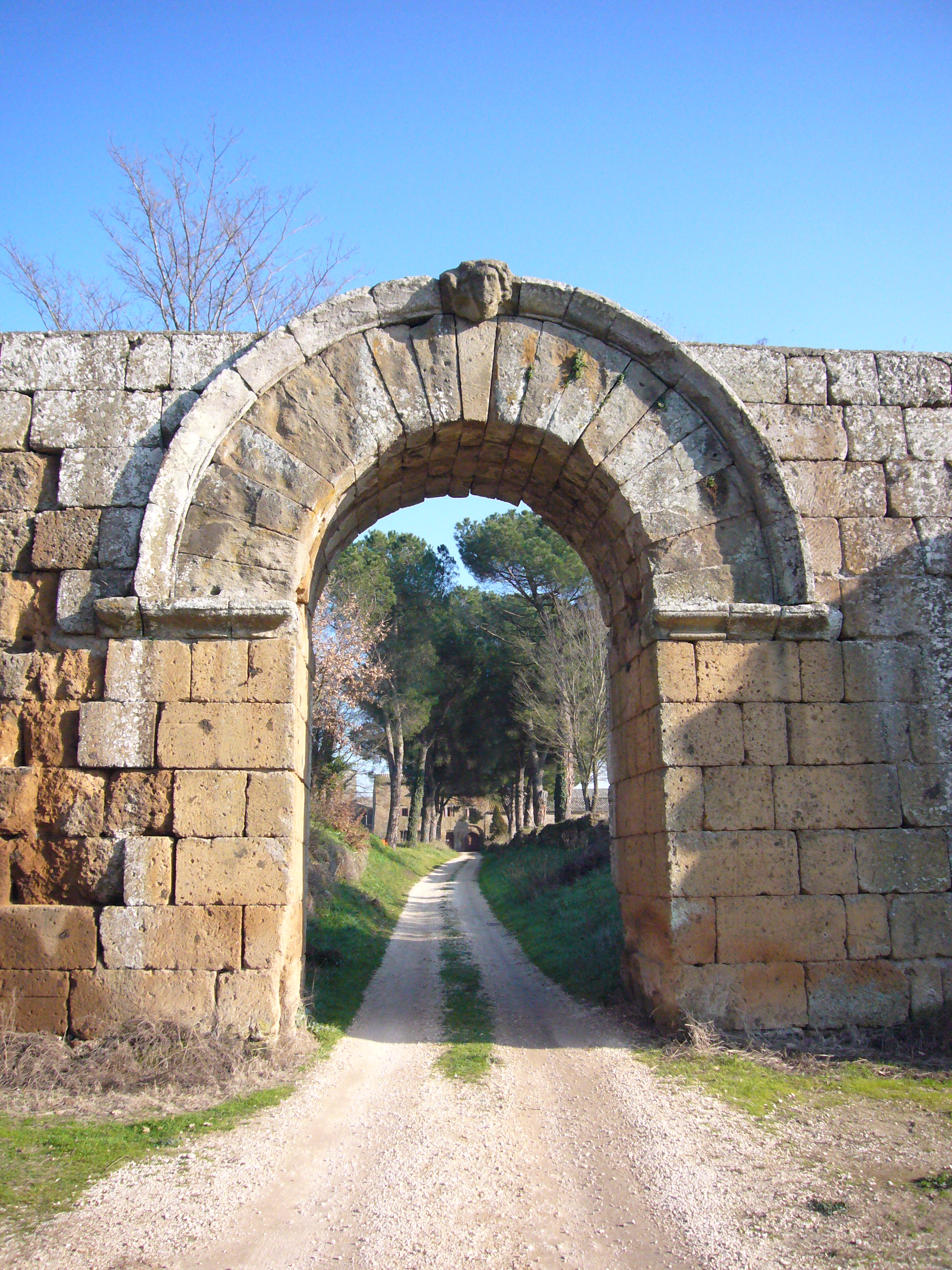
The Jupiter gate at Falerii Novi (c. 300 BC)

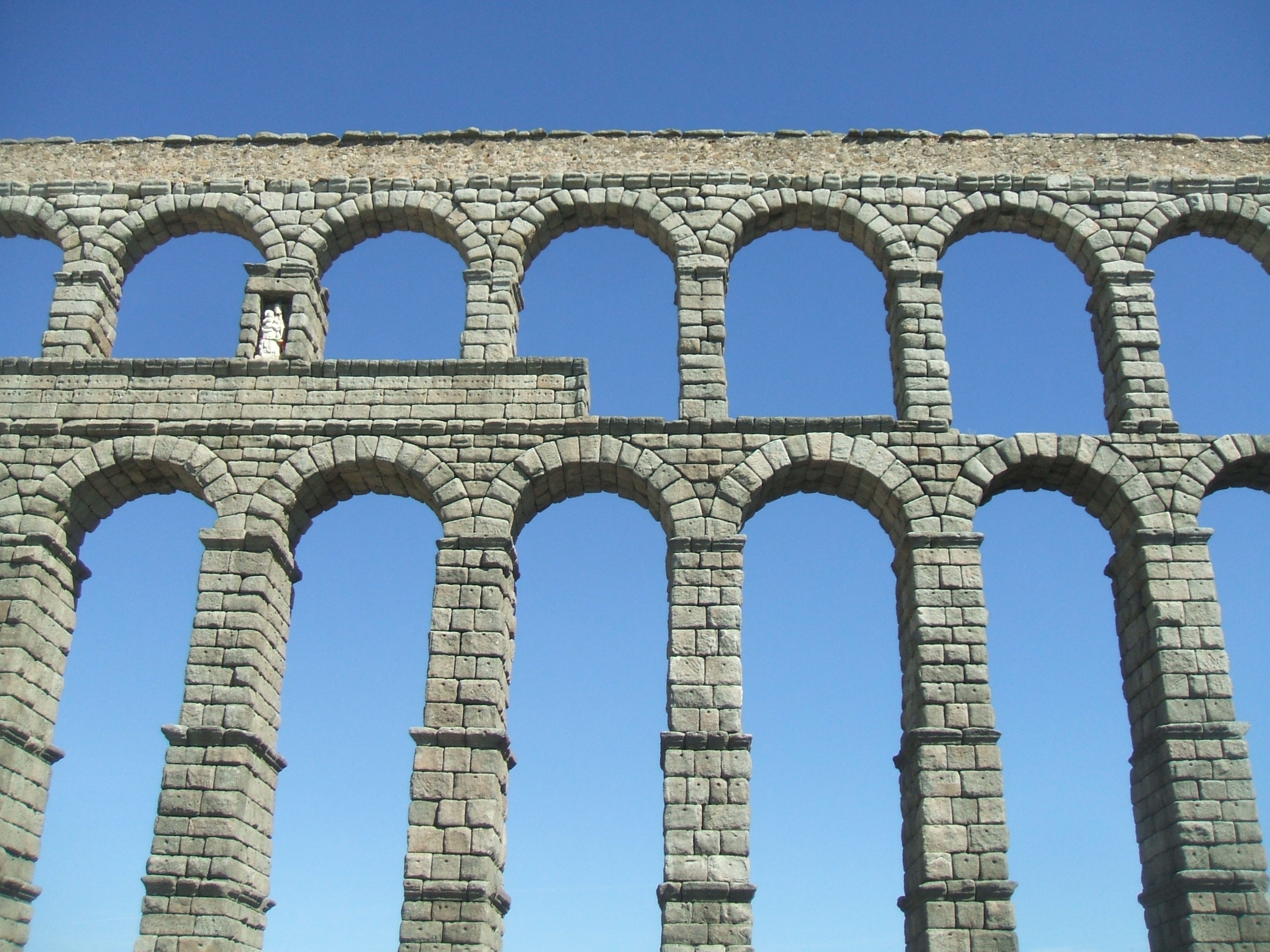
Arches of the aqueduct at Segovia

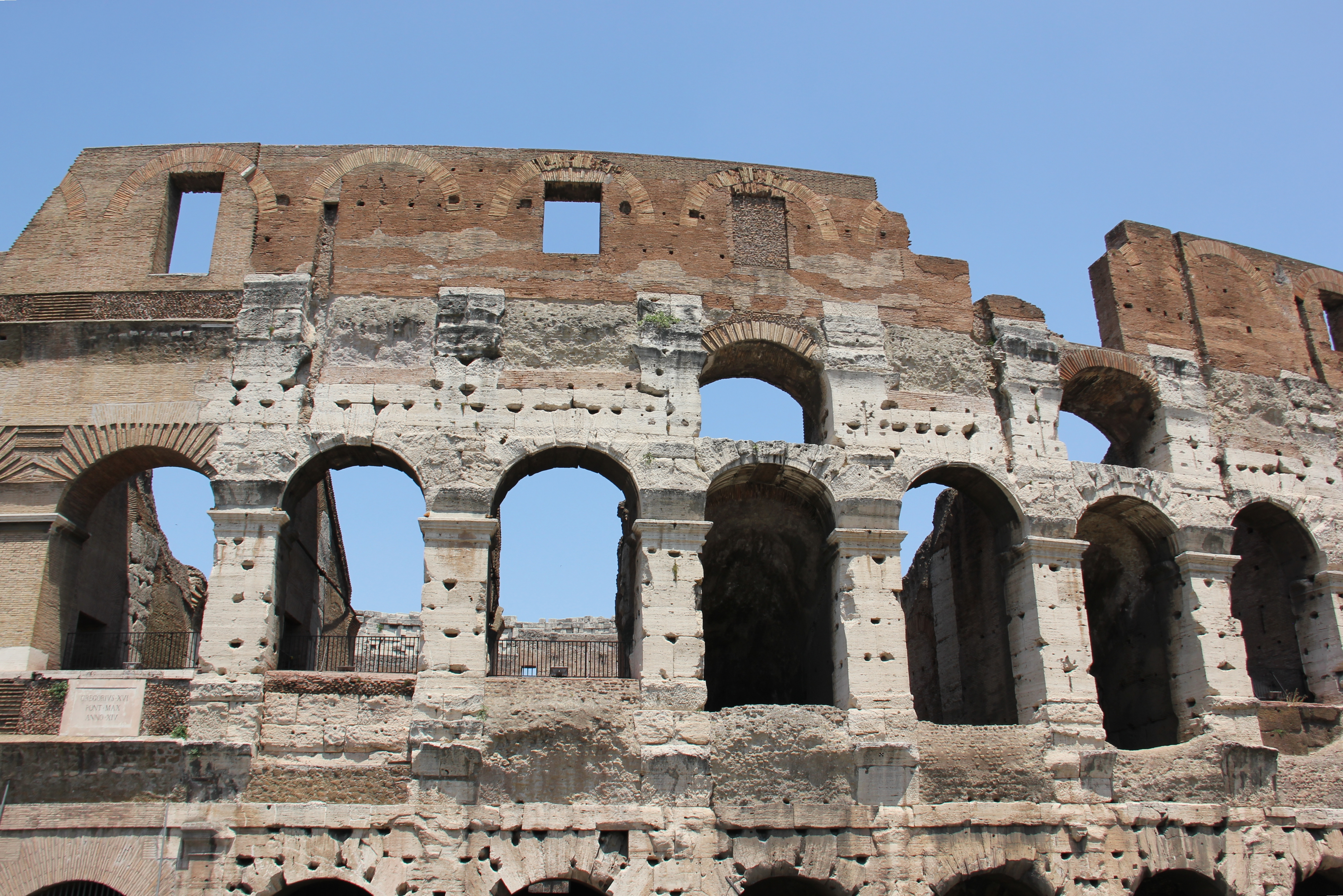
Arches of the Colosseum

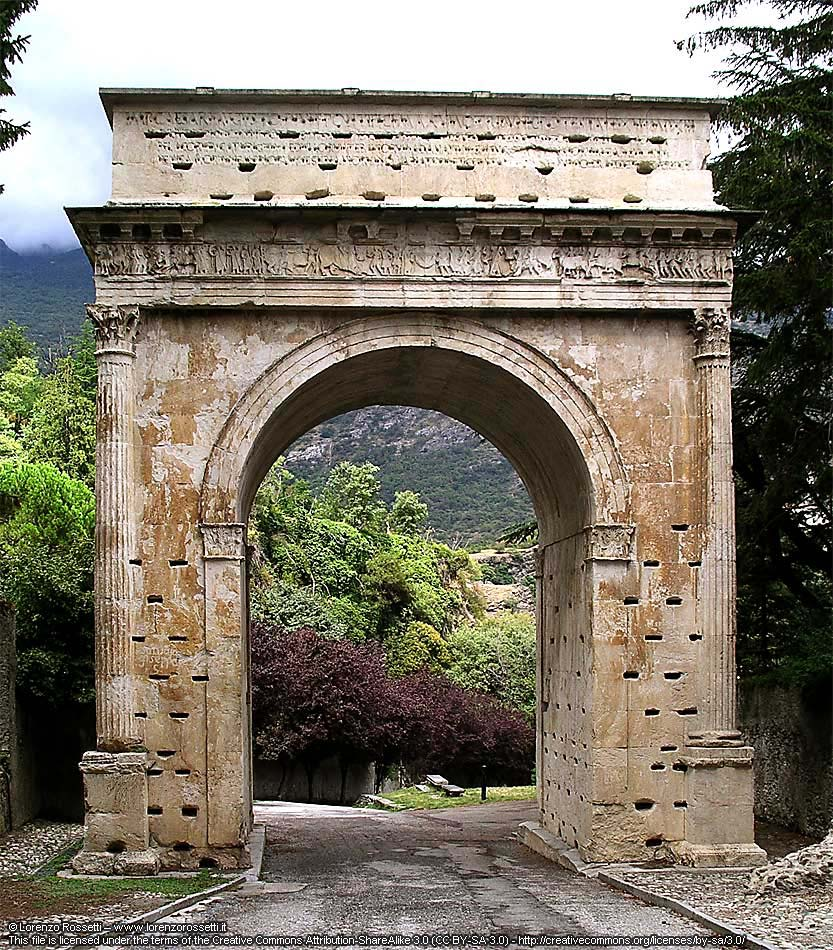
Arch of Augustus, Susa, Piedmont (c. 8 BC)

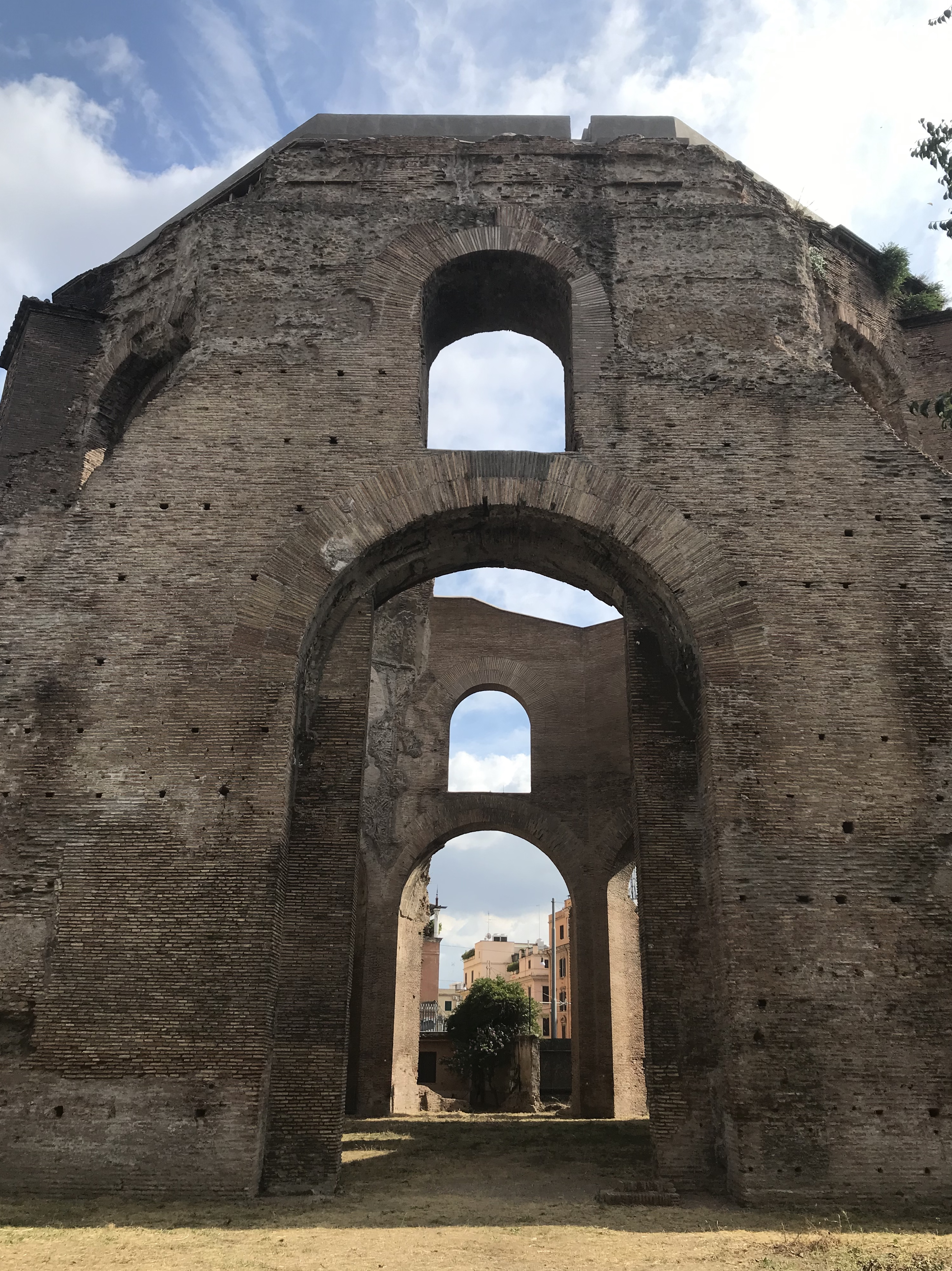
Arches at the "temple of Minerva Medica" in Rome

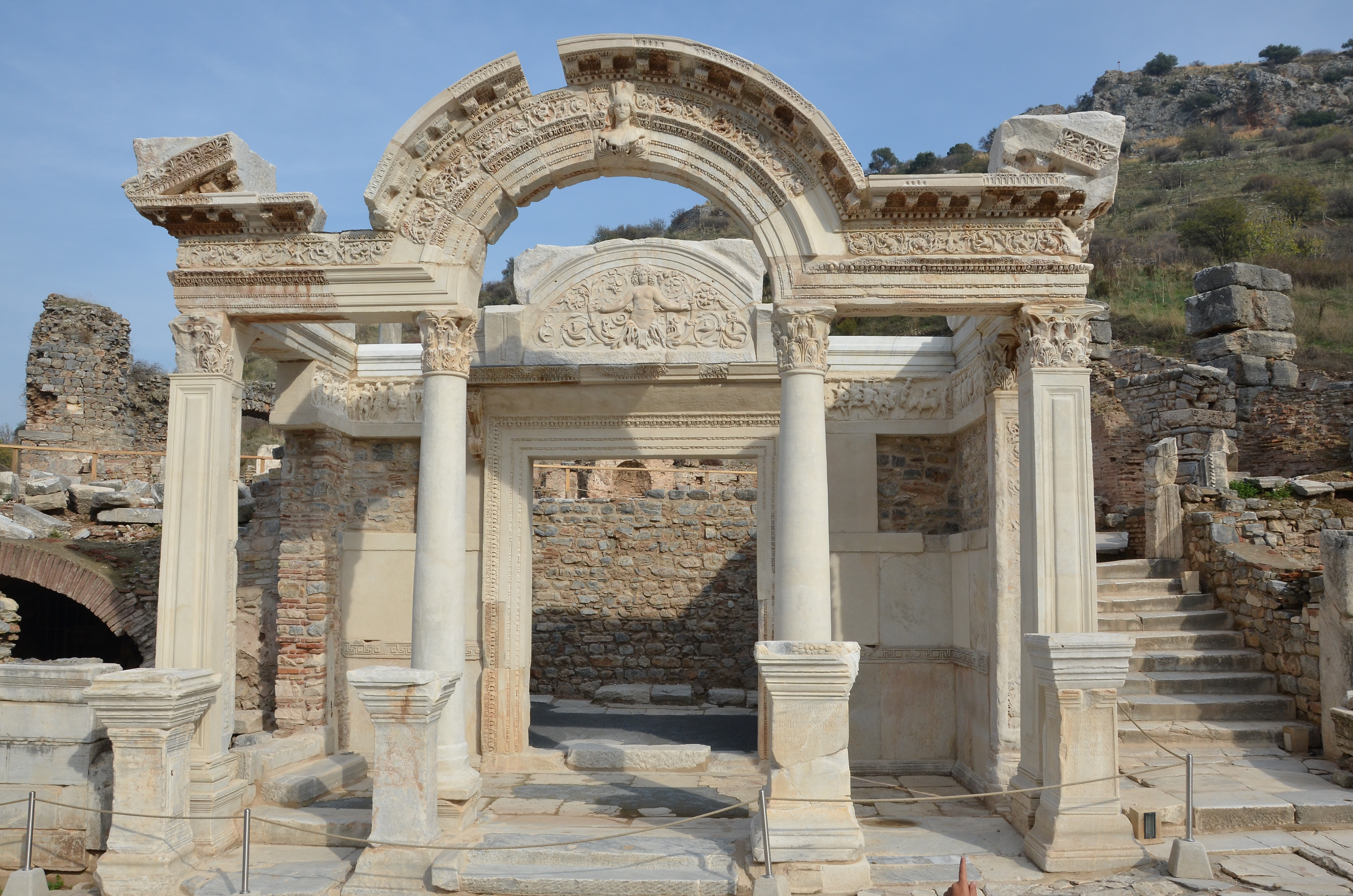
Temple of Hadrian at Ephesus combines a semicircular arch with the lintels (117 AD)

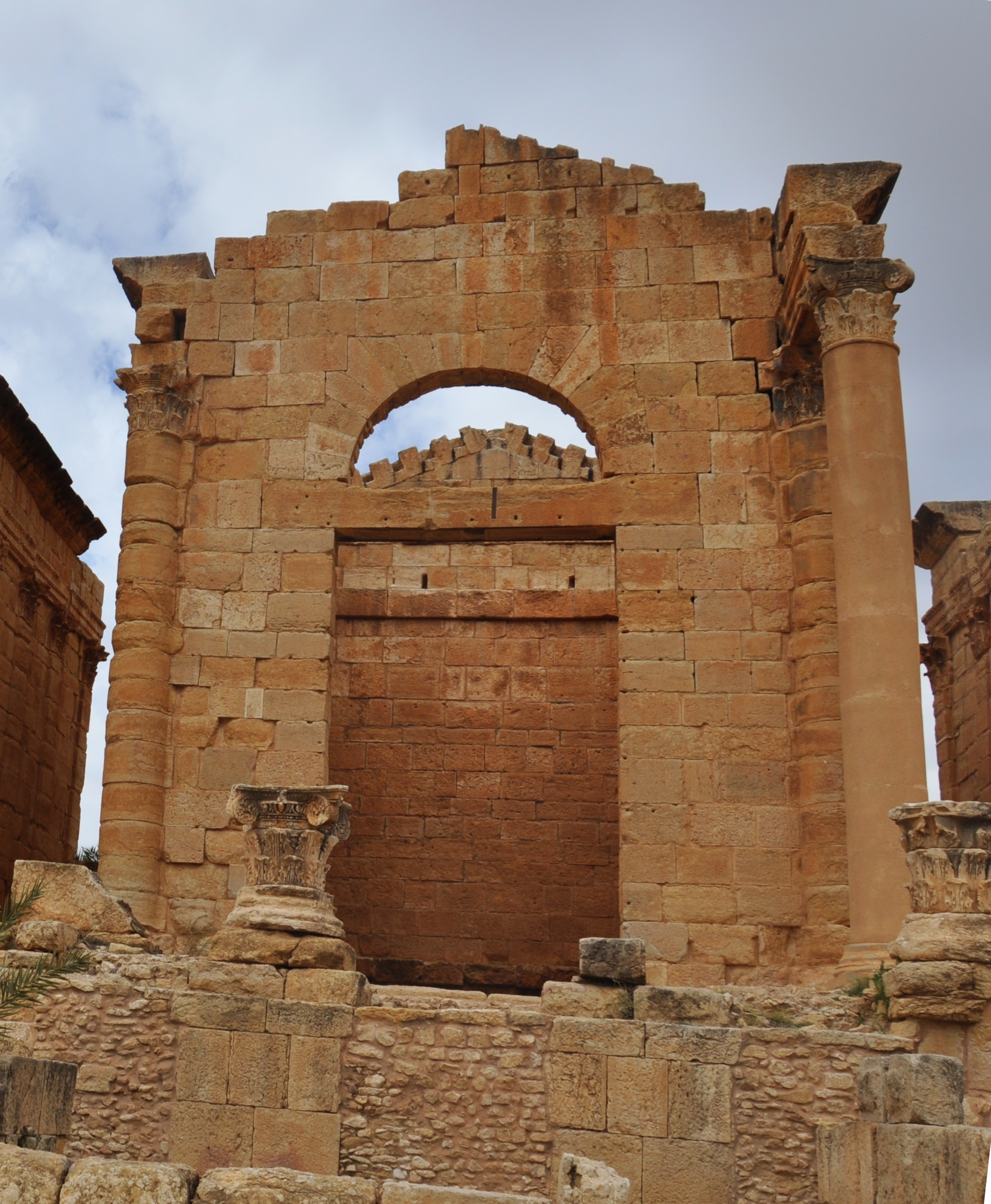
Temple of Jupiter at Sbeitla (c. 150 AD)

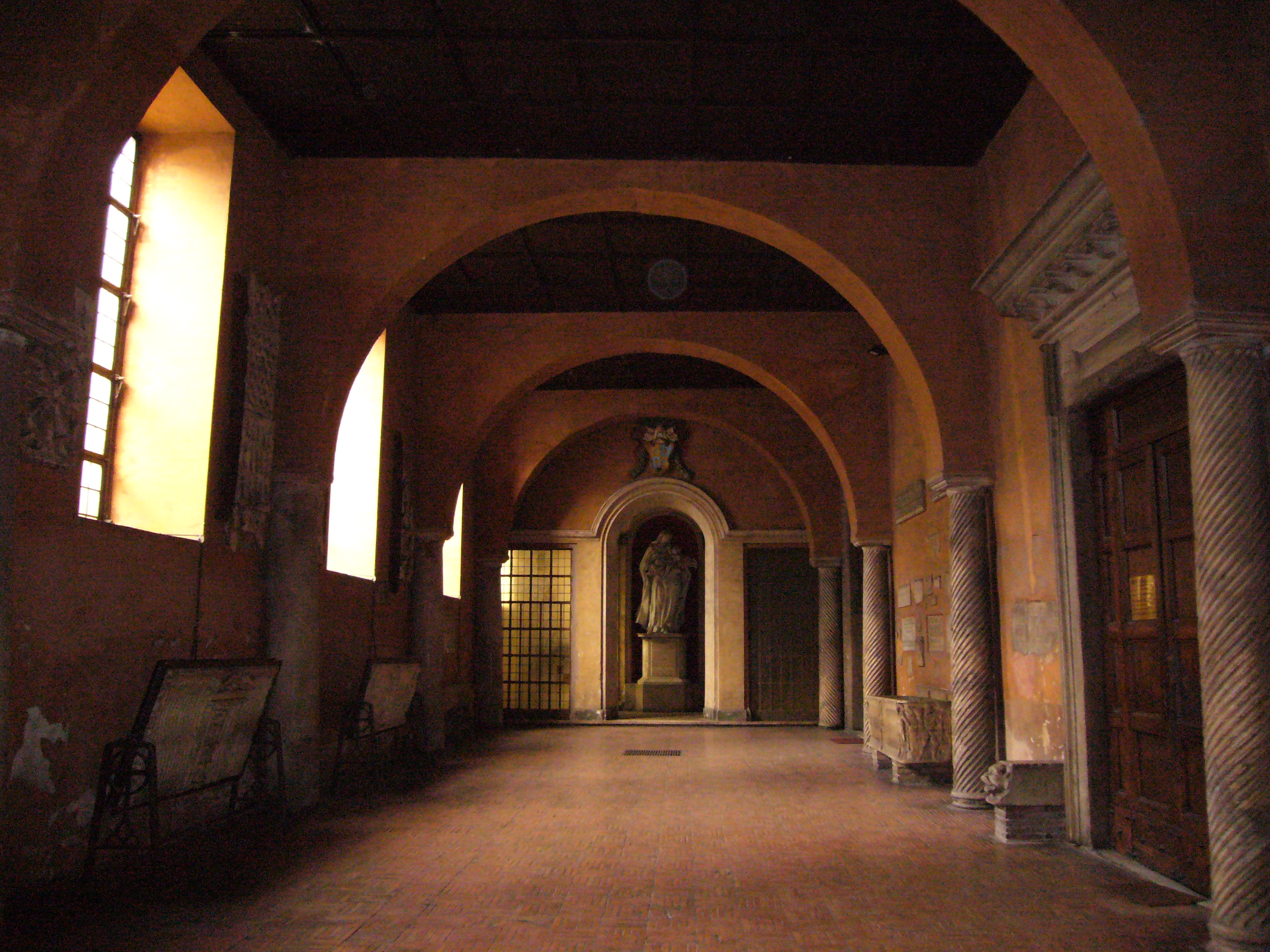
Arches in the narthex of Santa Sabina, Rome (c. 425 AD)

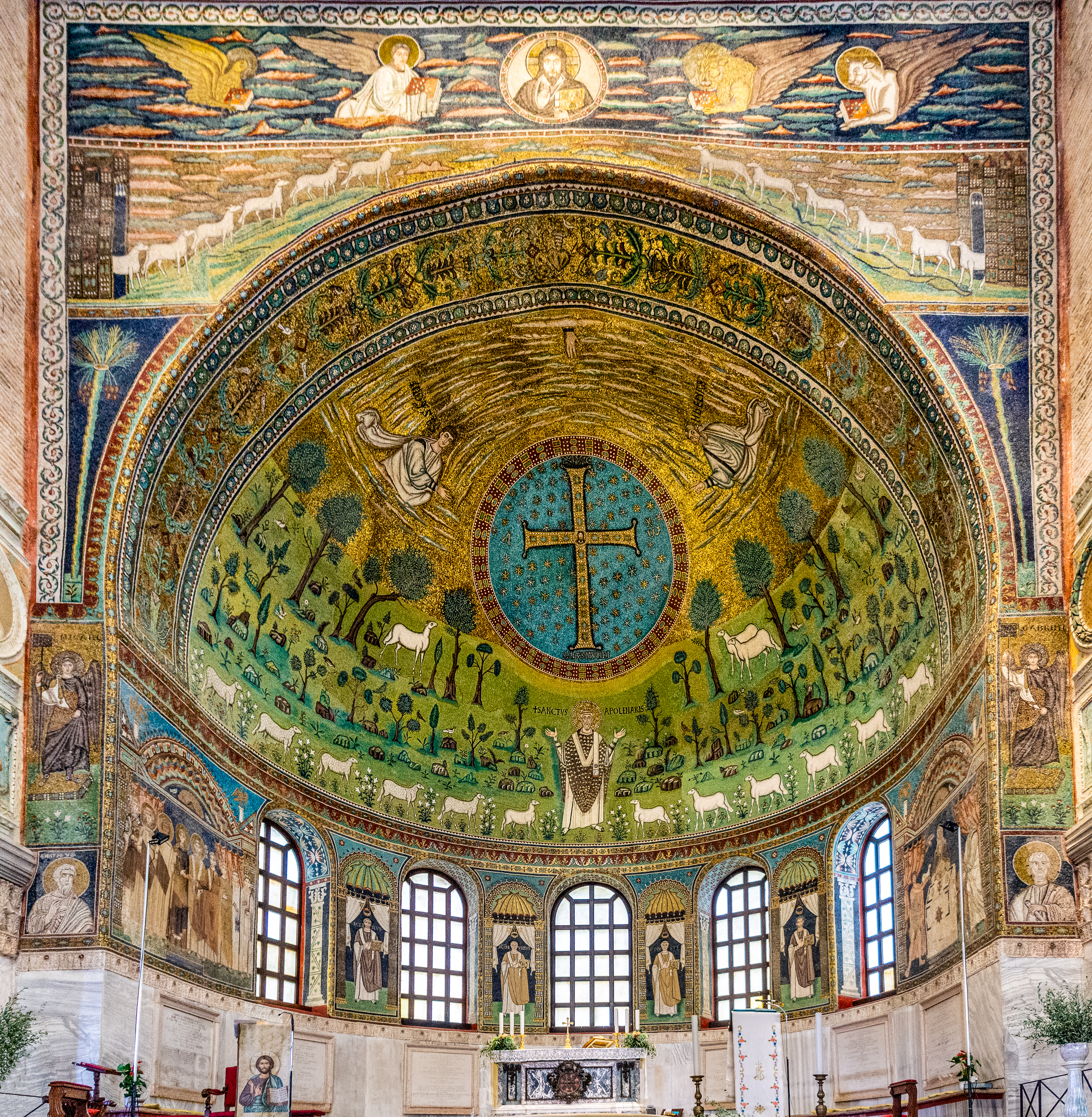
Arches and dome in Sant'Apollinare in Classe (534-536 AD)

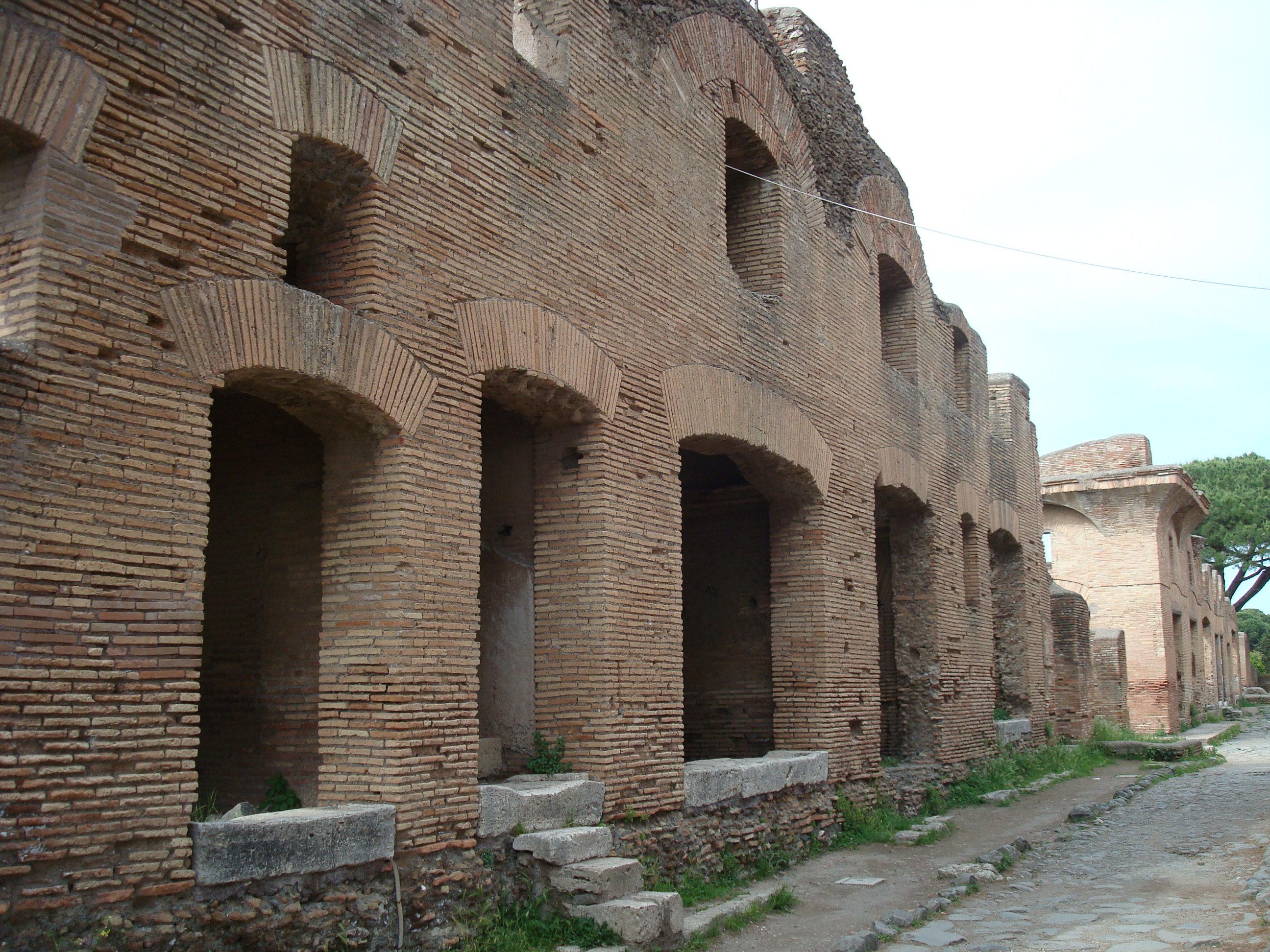
Segmental arches in an Ostian insula

=== Ancient China ===
Ancient architecture of China (and Japan) used mostly timber-framed construction and trabeated system. Arches were little-used, although there are few arch bridges known from literature and one artistic depiction in stone-carved relief. Since the only surviving artefacts of architecture from the Han dynasty (202 BC – 220 AD) are rammed earth defensive walls and towers, ceramic roof tiles from no longer existent wooden buildings, stone gate towers, and underground brick tombs, the known vaults, domes, and archways were built with the support of the earth and were not free-standing.

China's oldest surviving stone arch bridge is the Anji Bridge. Still in use, it was built between 595 CE and 605 CE during the Sui dynasty.

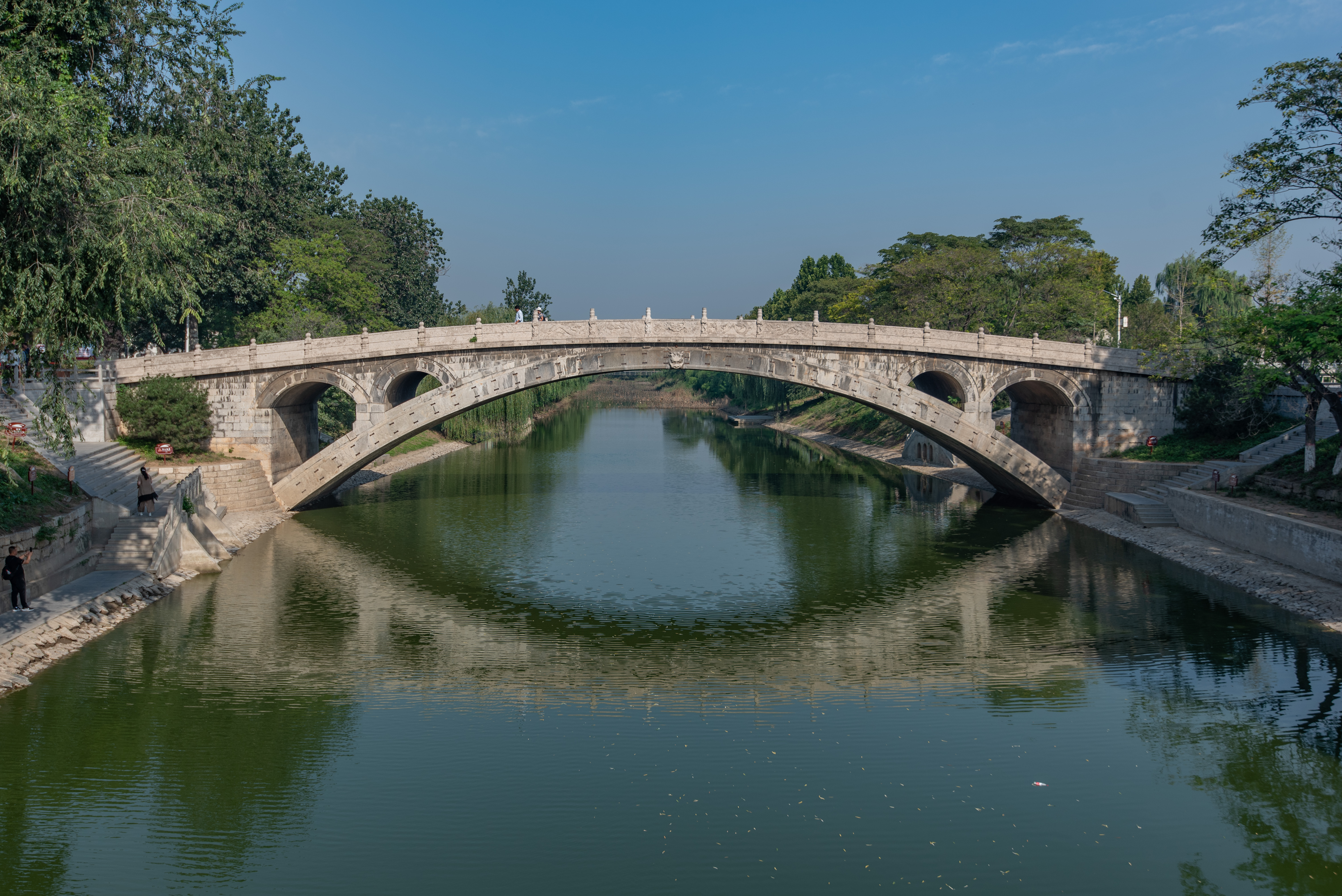
Anji Bridge: segmental arch, open-spandrel design

=== Islamic ===
Islamic architects adopted the Roman arches, but had quickly shown their resourcefulness: by the 8th century the simple semicircular arch was almost entirely replaced with fancier shapes, few fine examples of the former in the Umayyad architecture notwithstanding (cf. the Great Mosque of Damascus, 706–715 CE). The first pointed arches appear already at the end of the 7th century AD (Al-Aqsa Mosque, Palace of Ukhaidhir, cisterns at the White Mosque of Ramle). Their variations spread fast and wide: Mosque of Ibn Tulun in Cairo (876-879 AD), Nizamiyya Madrasa at Khar Gerd (now Iran, 11th century), Kongo Mosque in Diani Beach (Kenya, 16th century).

Islamic architecture brought to life a large amount of arch forms: the round horseshoe arch that became a characteristic trait of the Islamic buildings, the keel arch, the cusped arch, and the mixed-line arch (where the curved "ogee swell" is interspersed with abrupt bends). The Great Mosque of Cordoba, that can be considered a catalogue of Islamic arches, contains also the arches with almost straight sides, trefoil, interlaced, and joggled. Mosque of Ibn Tulun adds four-centred and stilted version of the pointed arch.

In al-Hakam II's enlargement of the Córdoba mosque, interlaced arches helped support the ribbed domes. At Tinmal Mosque, lambrequin arches mark the centre and ends of the arcade in front of the qibla wall, with different lobed forms between them.

Examples of pointed arches in Western Europe from the second half of the 11th century include those at Monte Cassino and at Cluny Abbey from 1088; the ogee arch appeared in Venice around 1250. The introduction of these forms has been linked to Islamic influence, possibly through Sicily. John Ruskin, however, traces the development of the Gothic ogee arch as an indigenous evolution of the different shapes ("orders") of the Florentine arch.

John Warren proposed an earlier transmission of the pointed arch to Italy. He dated the pointed arcades at St Mark's Basilica in Venice to the church built in 829–836, rather than to the late 12th or early 13th century, and linked them to the arrival of Greek craftsmen from Alexandria.

Saoud also credits to Islamic architects the spread of the transverse arch. Mixed-line arch became popular in the Mudéjar style and subsequently spread around the Spanish-speaking world.

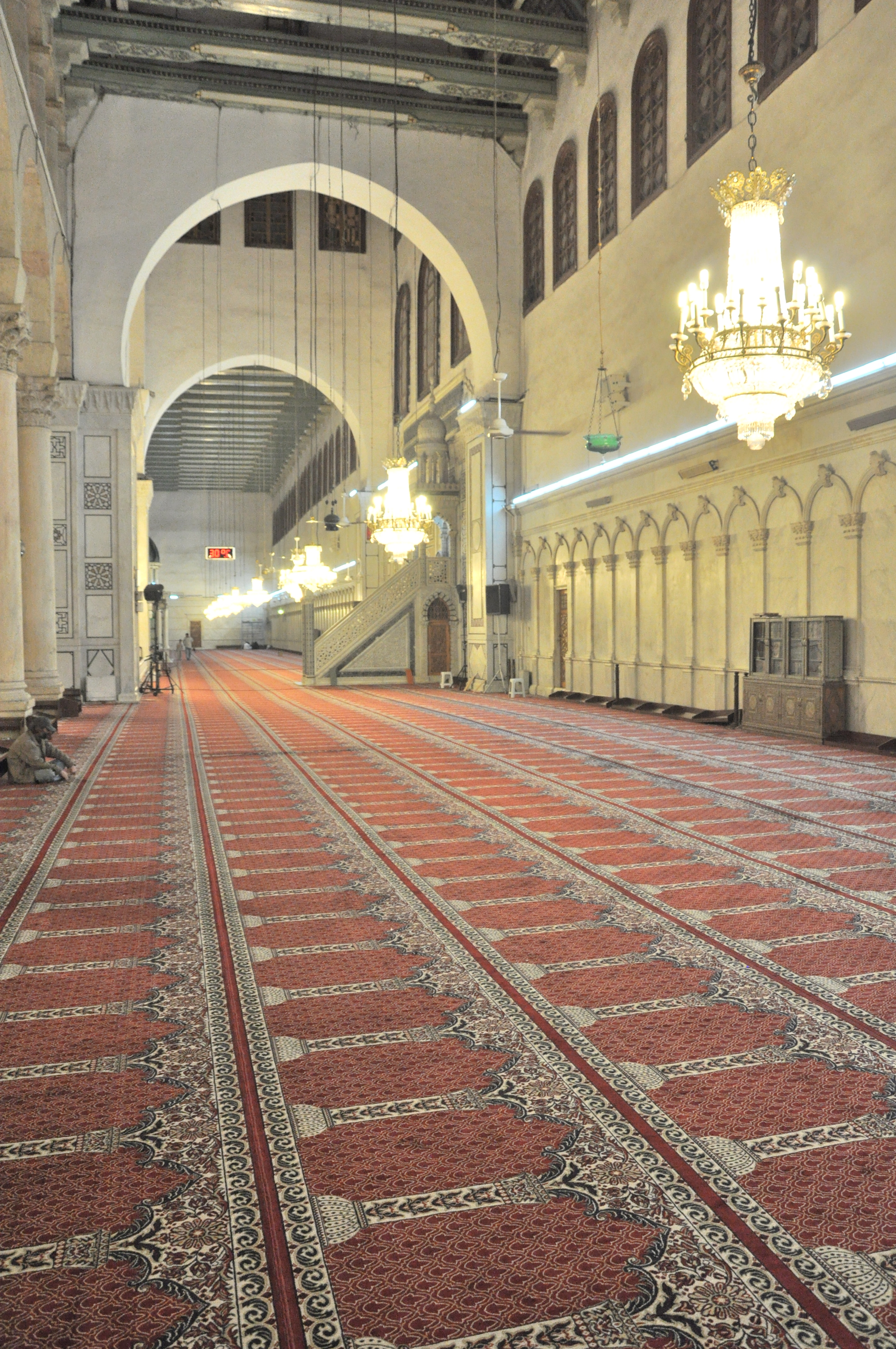
Semicircular arches at the Umayyad mosque

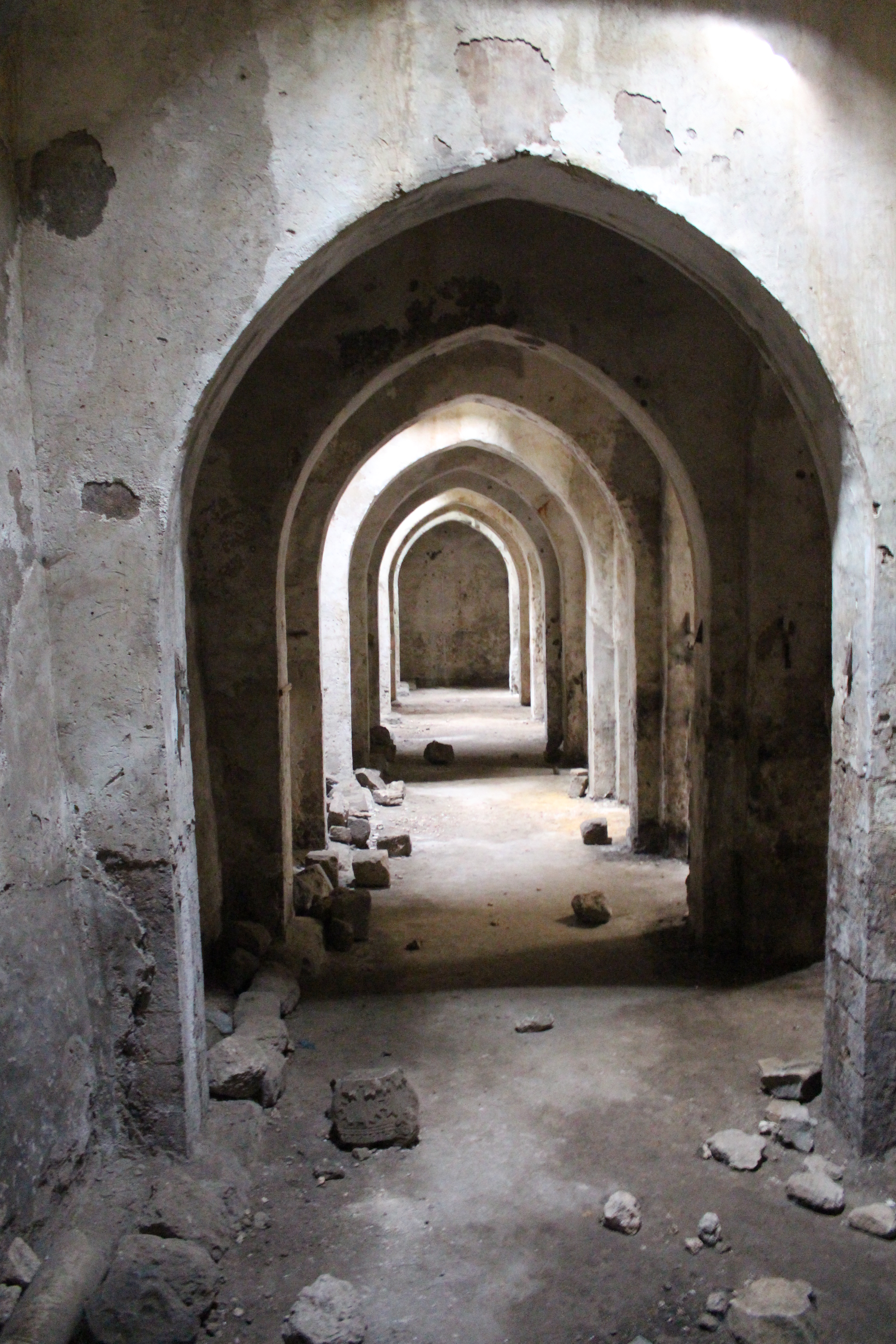
Pointed arches in the cisterns of the White Mosque in Ramla

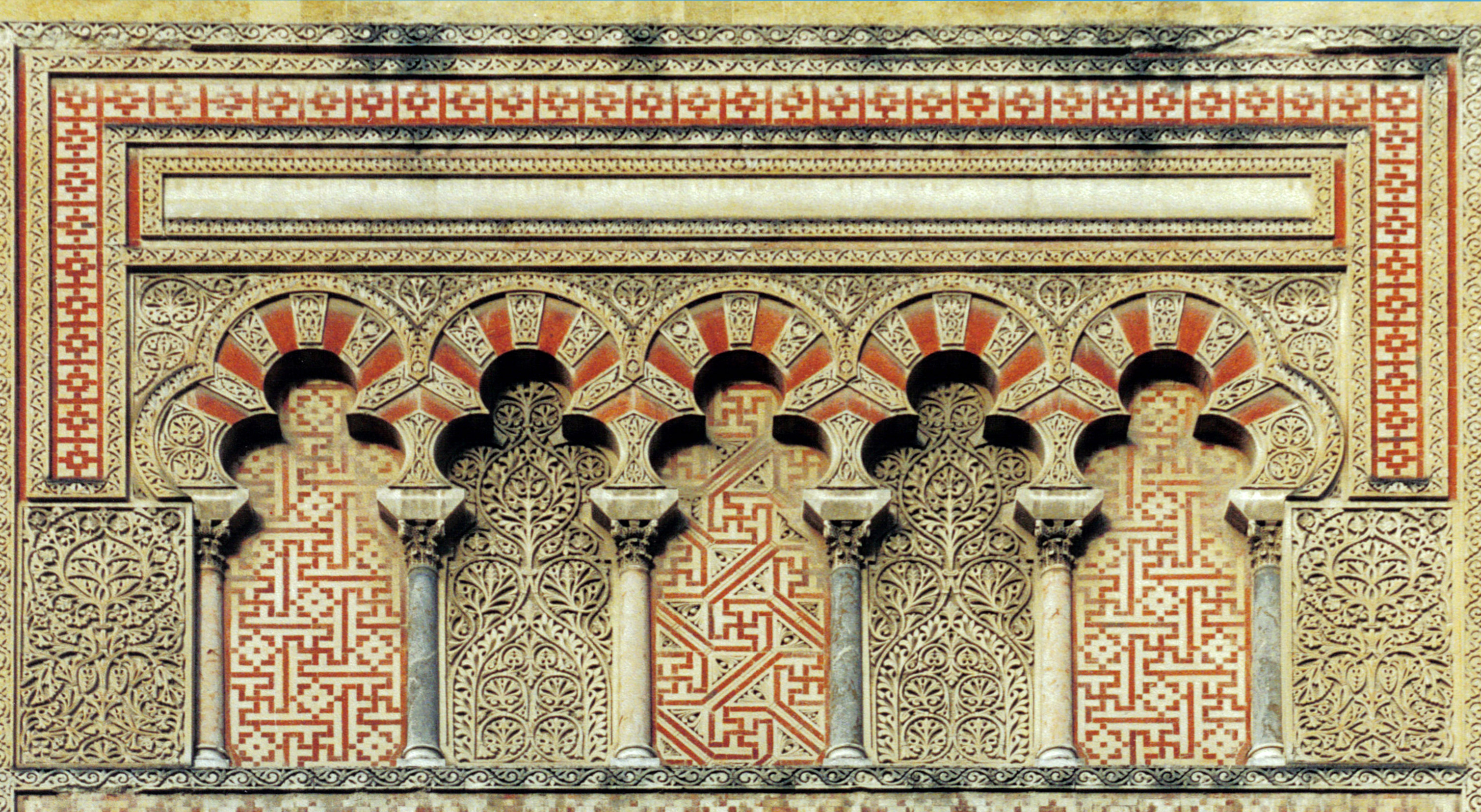
Trefoil arches at the Cordoba Mosque

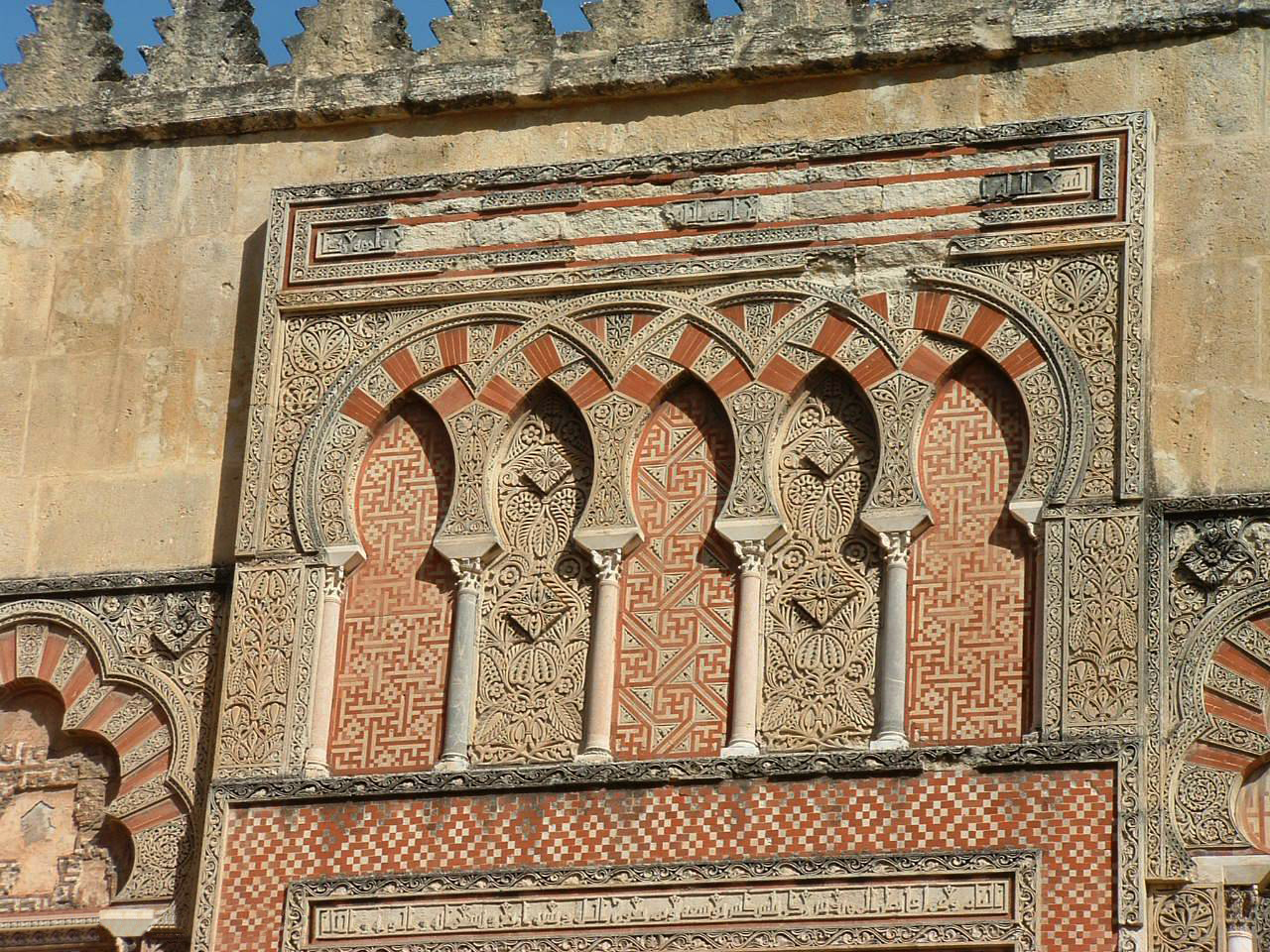
Interlaced arches at the Cordoba Mosque

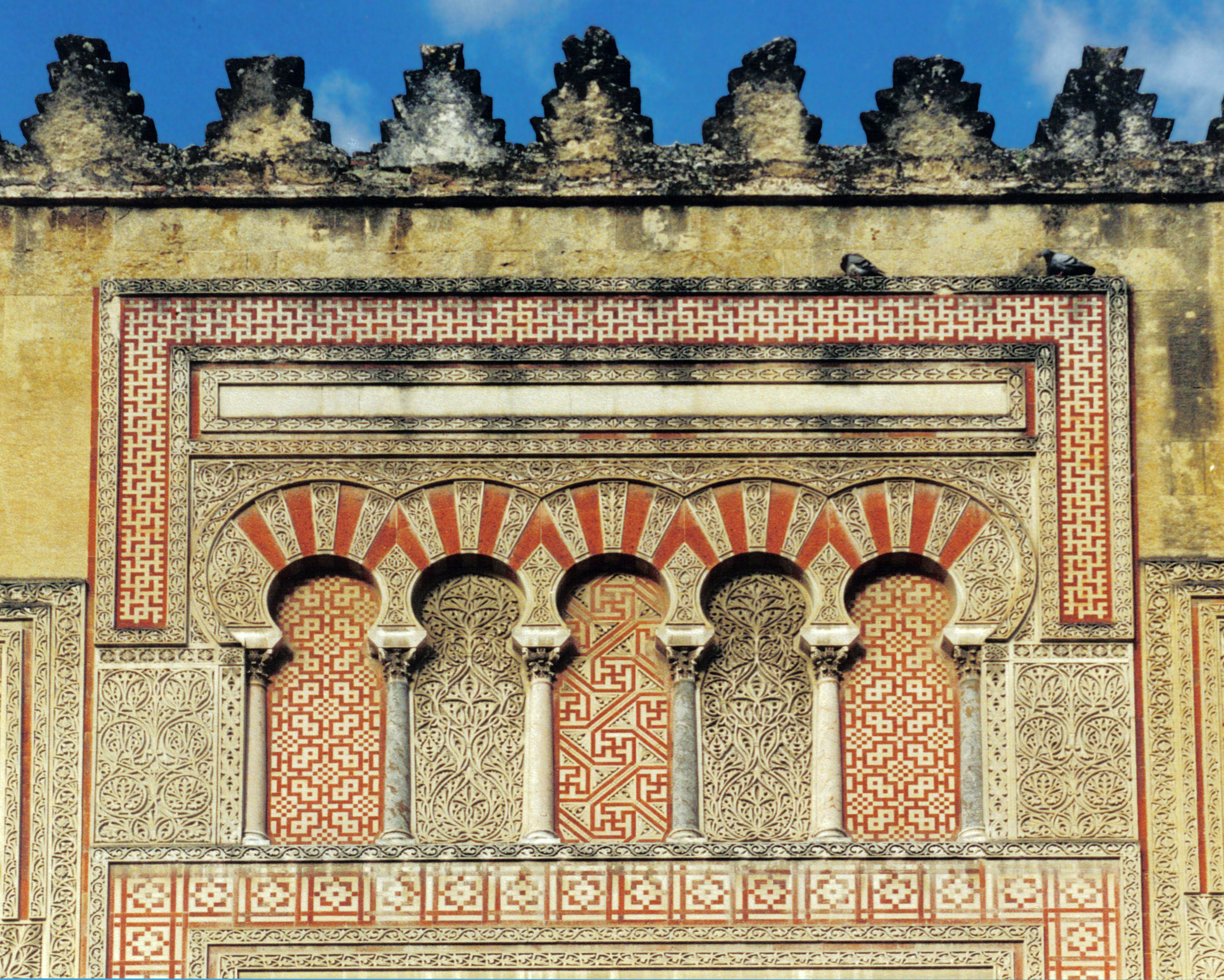
Horseshoe arches at the Cordoba Mosque

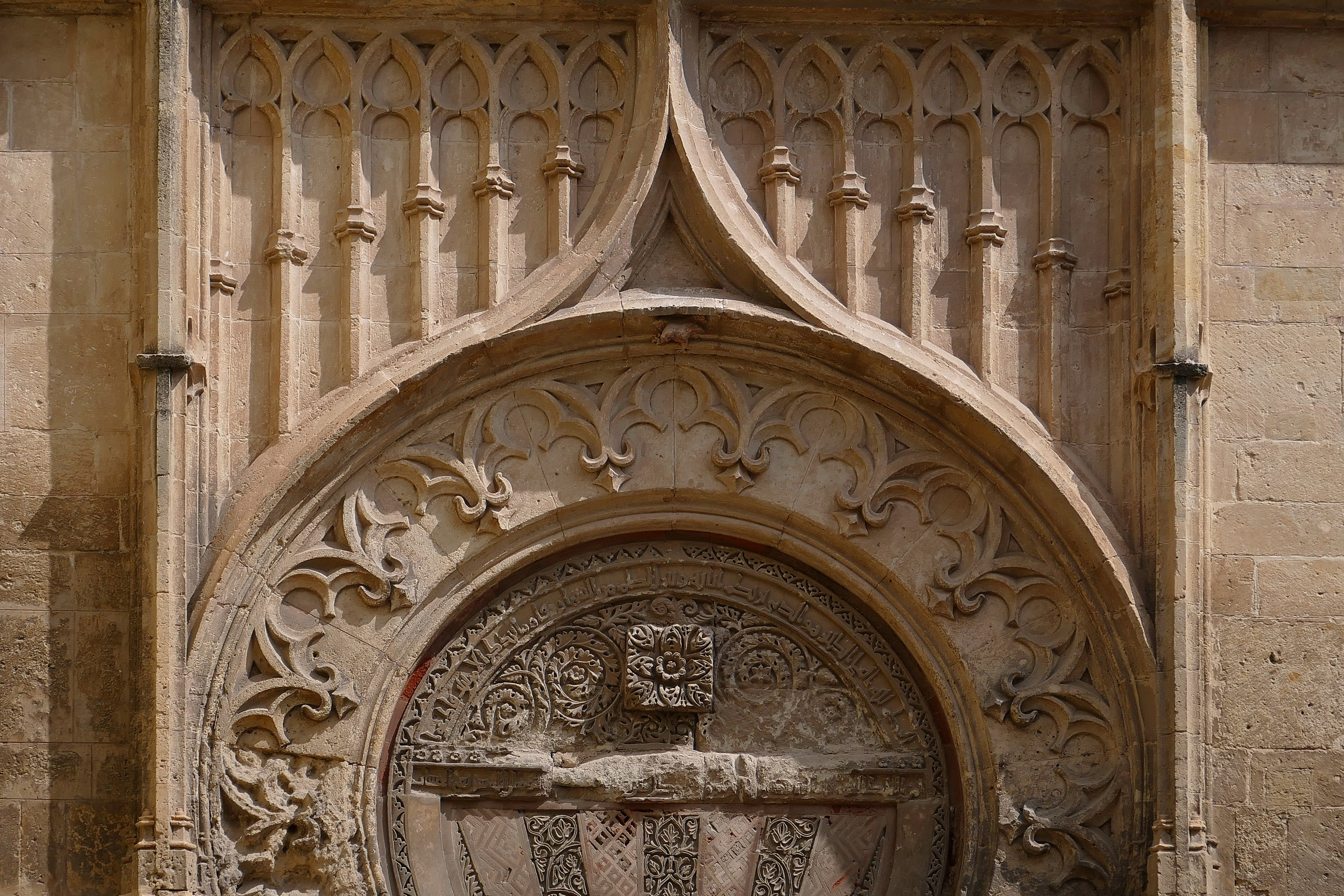
Ogee arch at the Cordoba Mosque

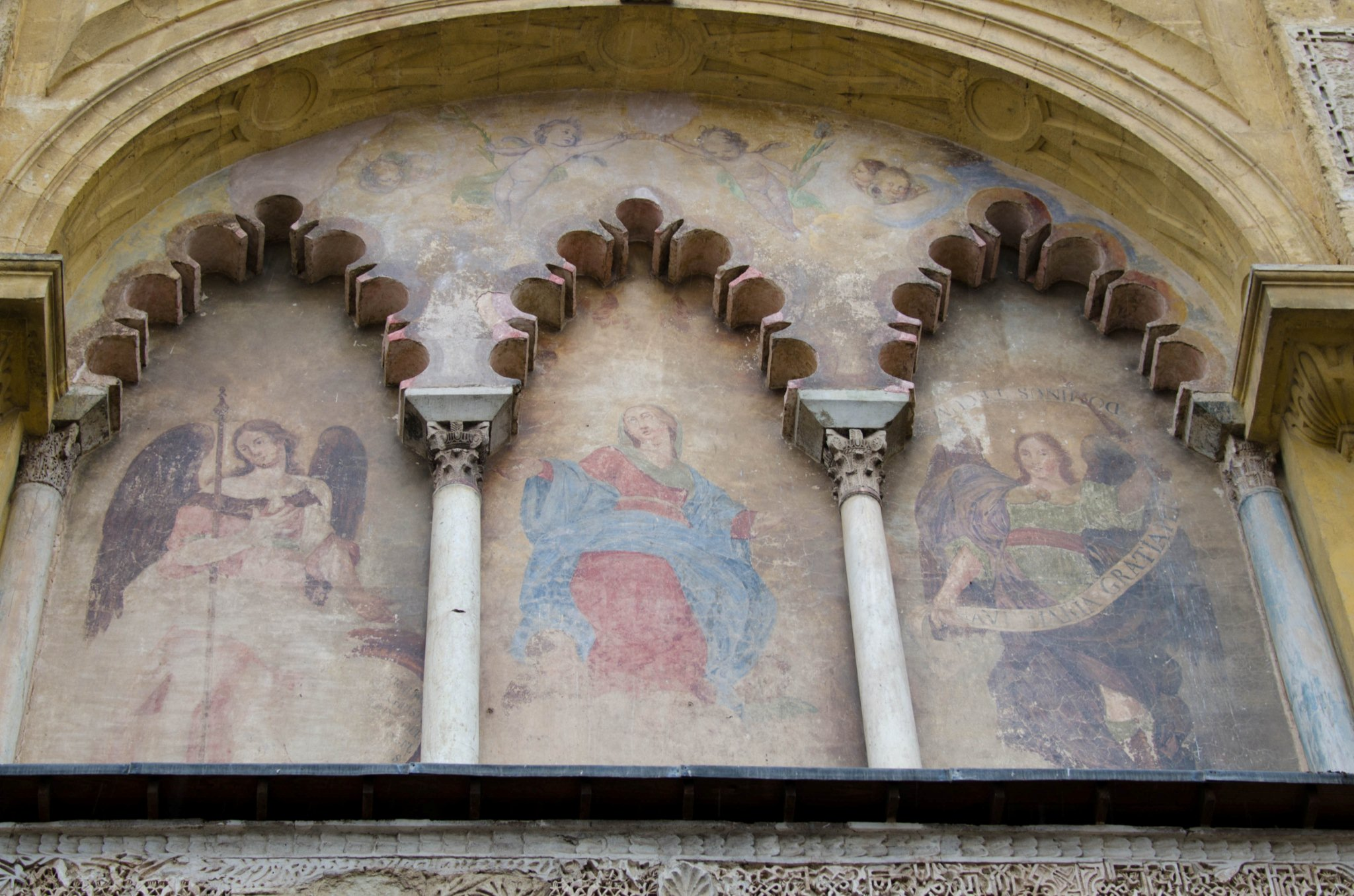
Cusped arhes at the Cordoba Mosque

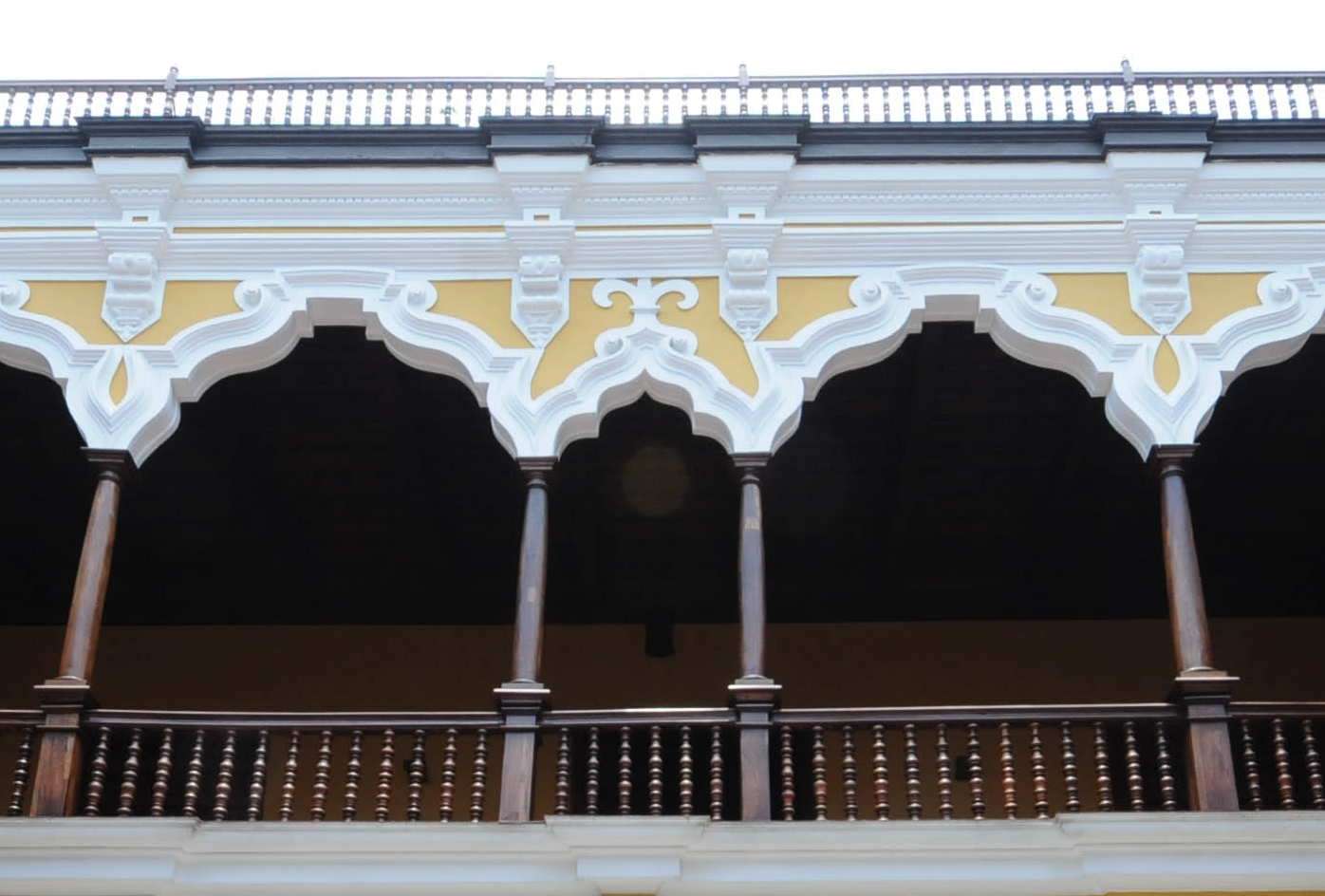
Mixed line arches at Palacio de Torre Tagle, Lima, Peru (1735)

=== Western Europe ===
The semicircular arch dominated Western European construction until about 1130. Its use in Pre-Romanesque styles continued Imperial Roman and Early Christian practice. The Christian Church was the principal building patron after the fifth-century collapse of the Western Roman Empire.

Recessed orders, also known as rebated arches, were used to decorate openings by about 1000. In this arrangement, the opening narrows in steps through the wall, each arch separated from the next by a rebate. This decoration made use of the depth of arches in thick walls, which had become necessary as builders increasingly used rubble or less accurately cut stone. Continuous mouldings and, later, sculpture added further ornament. Medieval builders often kept the intrados plain so that voussoirs could rest easily on centering. Projecting mouldings introduced there from the 13th century required specially shaped or double centering.

Experiments with the pointed arch in Romanesque buildings included Italian work and Cluny Abbey in Burgundy from 1088. The high rib vaults at Durham Cathedral have pointed transverse arches that may date to as early as 1120. Several pointed profiles occur in the west block of the Abbey of Saint-Denis, begun around 1135. High barrel vaults with a pointed profile, such as those at Fontenay Abbey (c. 1139–1147), became a characteristic feature of Cistercian architecture.

With pointed arches, builders could align the crowns of adjacent openings even when their spans differed. This gave Early Gothic architecture a way to combine unequal arches without stilting. The form also became integral to Gothic rib vault construction.

In Italy, where the pointed arch had been less fully adopted, the revival of Roman forms from about 1400 favoured the round arch. During the 16th century, Renaissance architecture spread across much of Europe and, through European expansion, beyond it. Later construction techniques using cast iron, steel, and concrete reduced the structural dominance of the arch.

=== India ===
The history of arch in India is very long (some arches were apparently found in excavations of Kosambi, 2nd millennium BC. However, the continuous history begins with rock-cut arches in the Lomas Rishi cave (3rd century BC). Vaulted roof of an early Harappan burial chamber has been noted at Rakhigarhi. S.R Rao reports vaulted roof of a small chamber in a house from Lothal. Barrel vaults were also used in the Late Harappan Cemetery H culture dated 1900 BC-1300 BC which formed the roof of the metal working furnace, the discovery was made by Vats in 1940 during excavation at Harappa.

The use of arches until the Islamic conquest of India in the 12th century AD was sporadic, with ogee arches and barrel vaults in rock-cut temples (Karla Caves, from the 1st century BC) and decorative pointed gavaksha arches. By the 5th century AD voussoir vaults were used structurally in the brick construction. Surviving examples include the temple at Bhitargaon (5th century AD) and Mahabodhi Temple (7th century AD), the latter has both pointed arches and semicircular arches. These Gupta era arch vault system was later used extensively in Burmese Buddhist temples in Pyu and Bagan in 11th and 12th centuries.

With the arrival of Islamic and other Western Asia influence, the arches became prominent in the Indian architecture, although the post and lintel construction was still preferred. A variety of pointed and lobed arches was characteristic for the Indo-Islamic architecture, with the monumental example of Buland Darwaza, that has pointed arch decorated with small cusped arches.

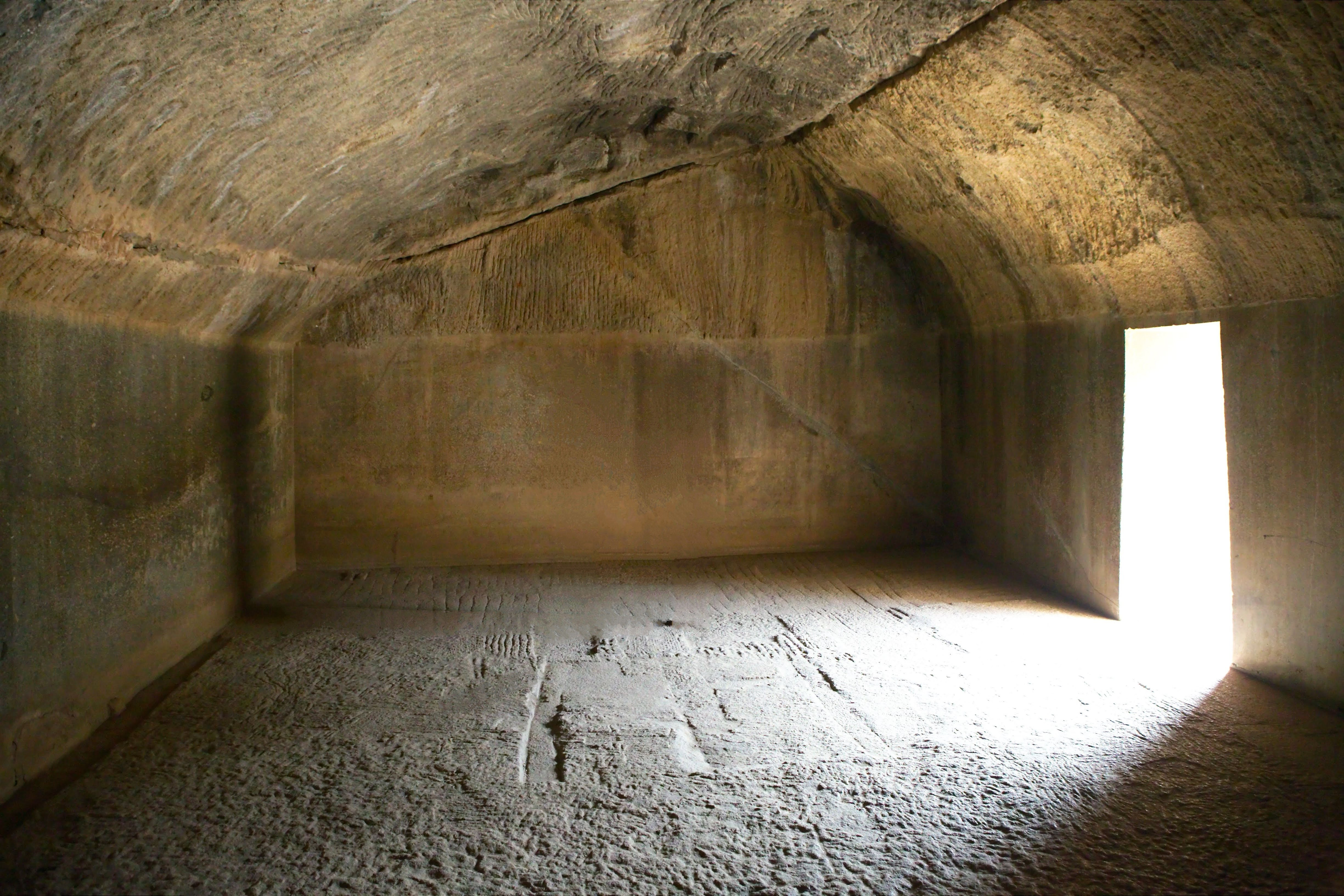
The insides of the Lomas Rishi cave

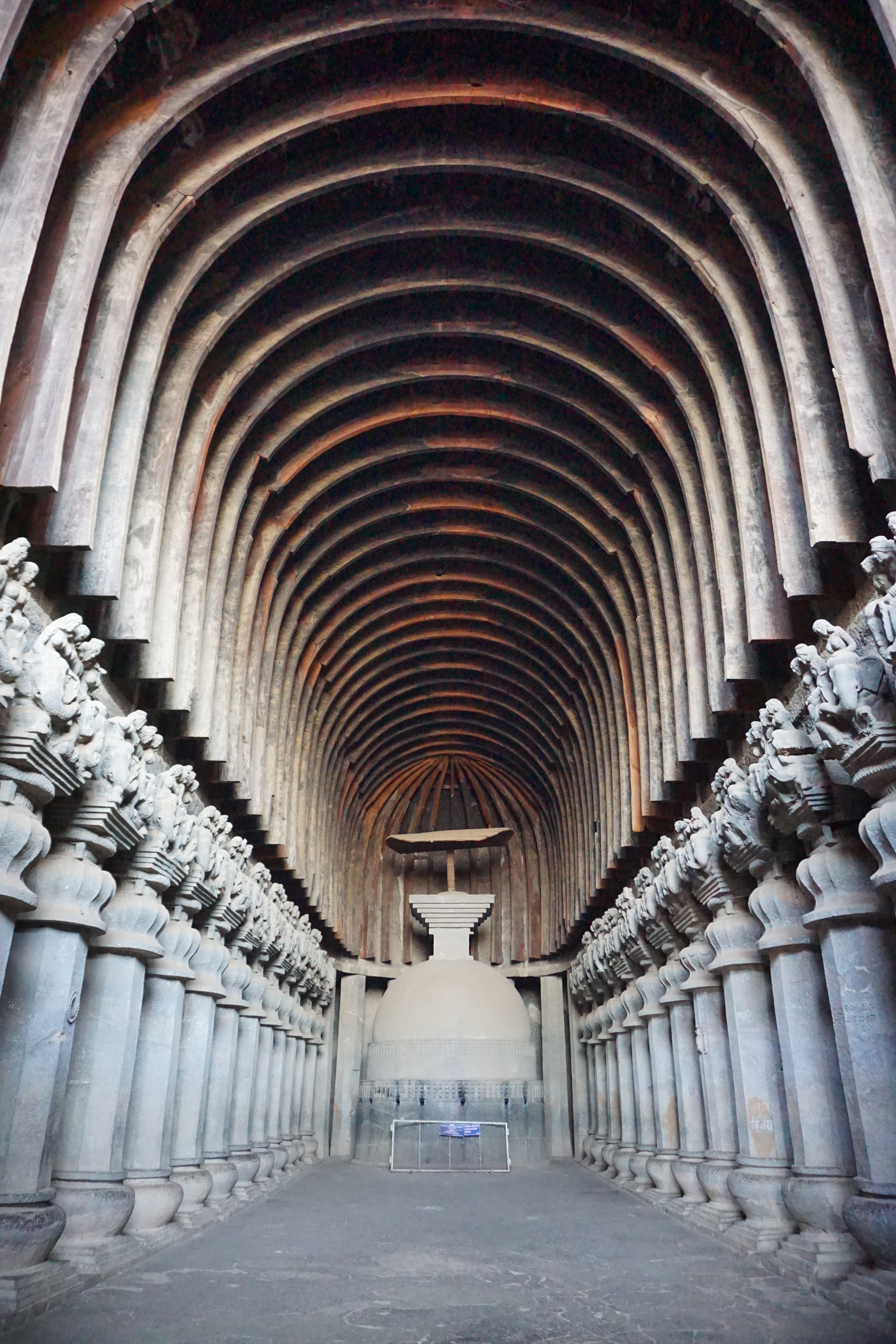
Arches at Karle (Great Chaitya, 1st century AD)

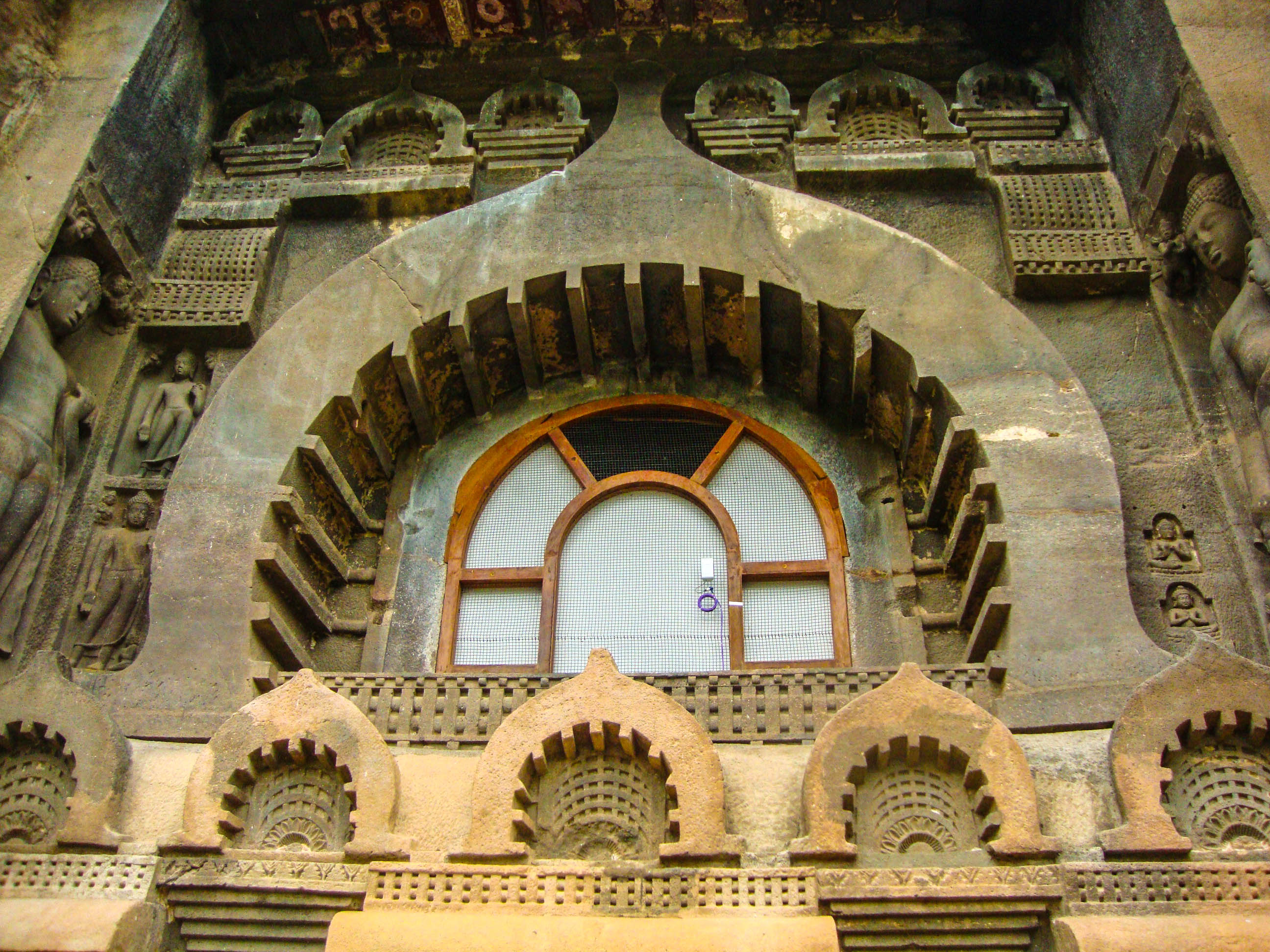
Decorative ogee arches (gavaksha) in Ajanta Caves

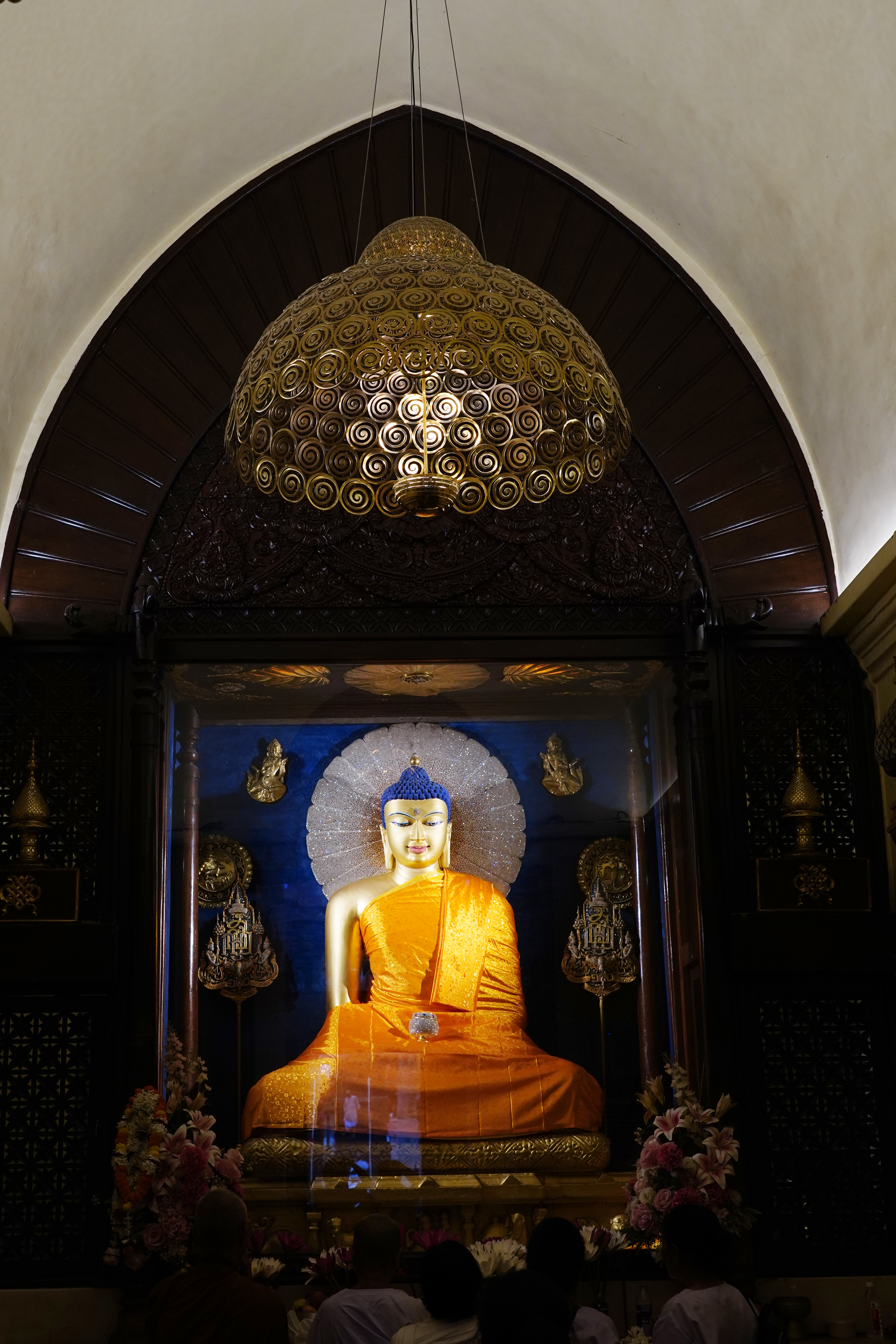
Pointed vault at the Mahabodhi temple

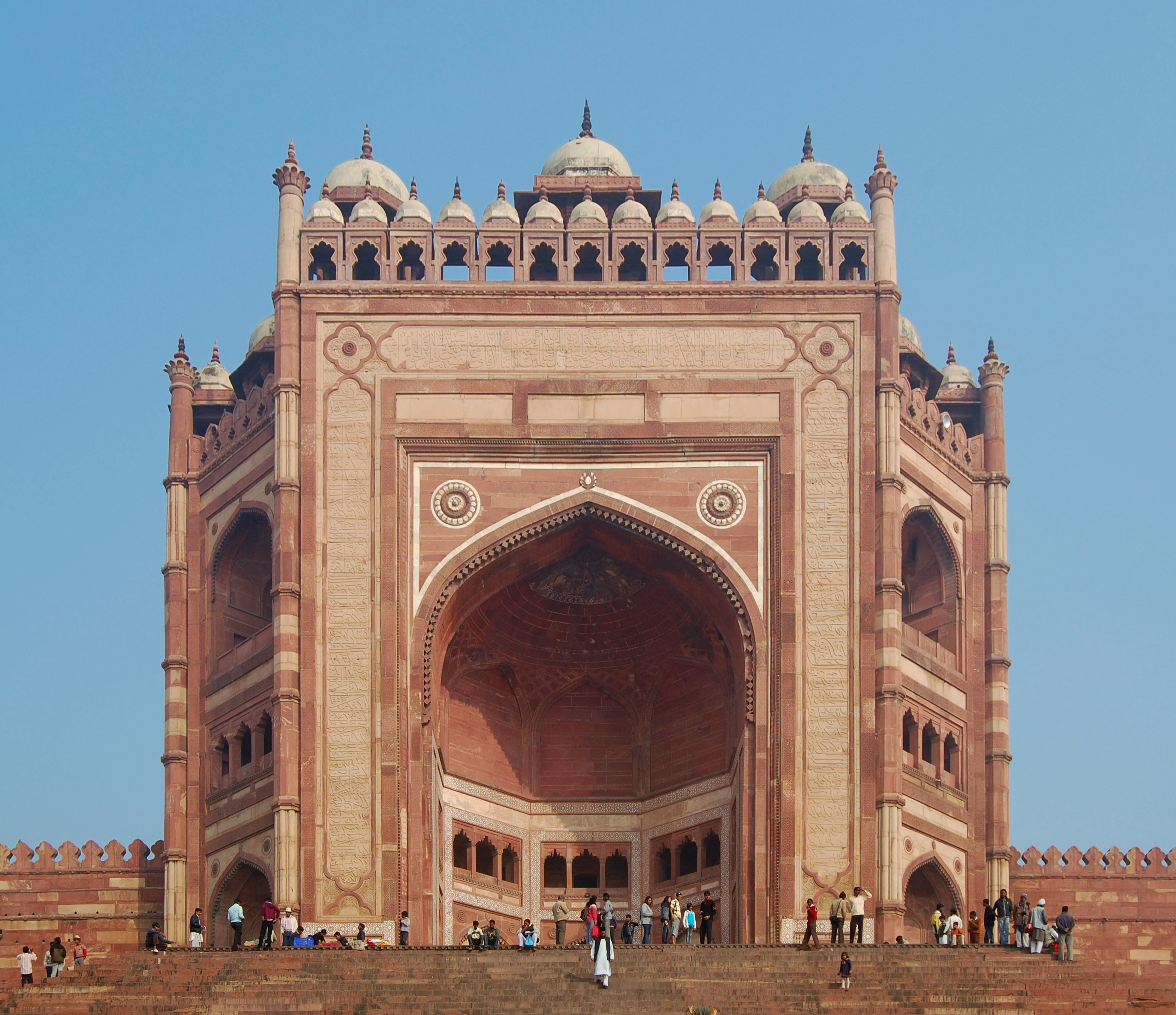
Arches at Buland Darwaza (16th century AD)

=== Korea ===
The date when arches first came into use in Korea is unknown, but early examples occur in the brick-built tombs of Lelang near Pyongyang, dating from approximately the third and fourth centuries AD. Chinese influence is evident in the vaulted brick tombs of Baekje, including the tomb of King Muryeong, which followed southern Chinese models. During the Unified Silla period, the construction of arch bridges was active after earlier designation of Korean Buddhism as the state religion; many temples were built by the royal family or aristocracy. The construction of Bulguksa temple with stairway bridges by Kim Daeseong started in 751, taking 24 years to finish. Three bridges – Cheongungyo (청운교), Baegungyo (백운교), and Yeonhwagyo (연화교) – included arches.

Among the palace bridges, the surviving ancient arch bridges are simple two-span bridges; they utilize well-polished, relatively large granite blocks, resulting in a small number of structural members and a semicircular shape. The bridge deck is divided into three sections; the central section served as the king's passage, while the left and right sides were used by courtiers. Consequently, the bridge is wide and the deck is relatively flat. As they were constructed over Geumcheon, an artificial waterway within the palace, the river width is narrow and the span length is relatively short. Yeongjegyo (영제교) at Gyeongbokgung Palace, a representative palace bridge, was completed in 1395.

The Gwanghwamun was built in 1398 during the Joseon Dynasty. It features three arched gates in three locations on the stone foundation. The central arch is 17 cheok 5 chon high and 18 cheok wide, while the arches on both sides are 16 cheok high and 14 cheok 5 chon wide.

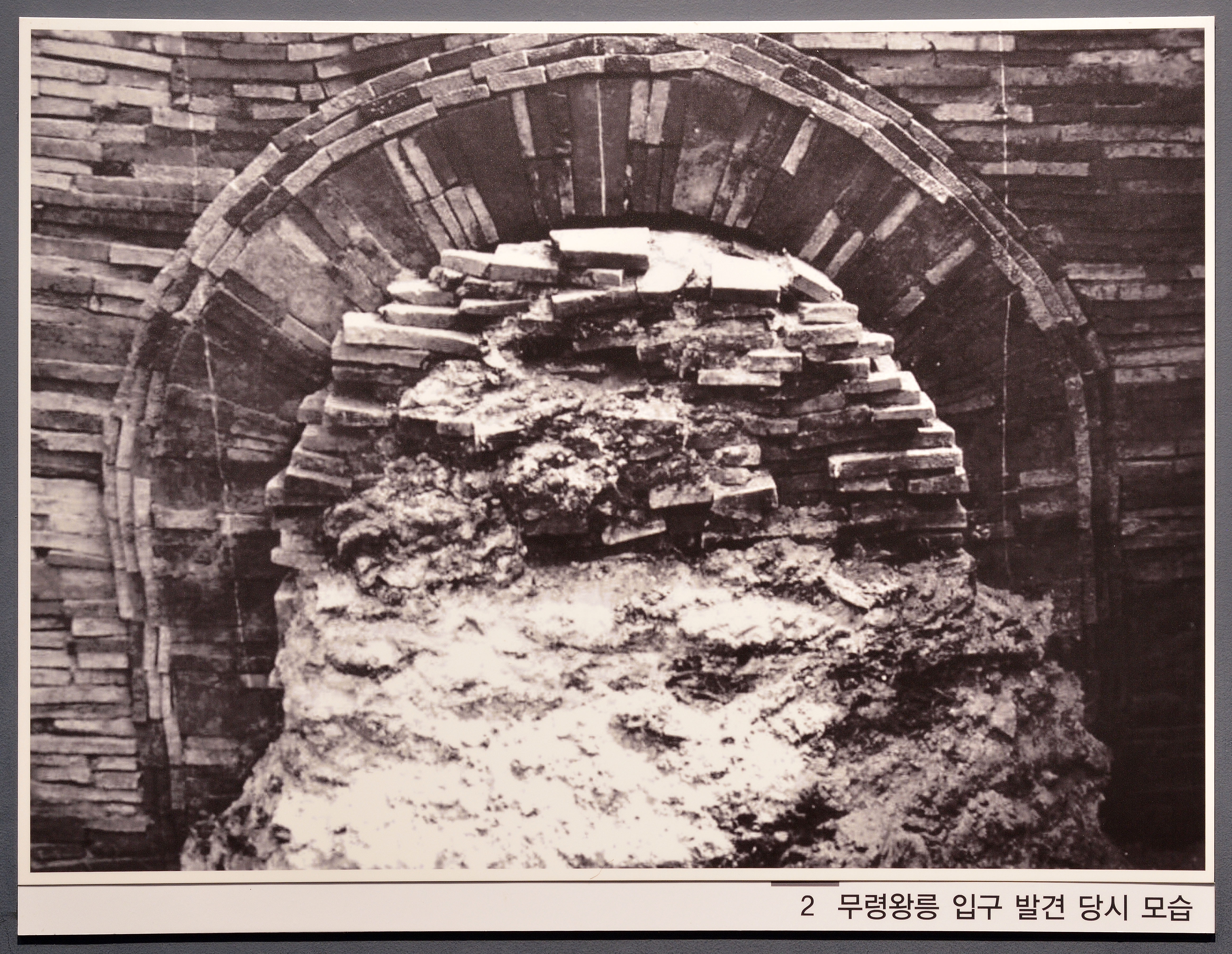
Arch at the tomb of King Muryeong (at the time of discovery)

The three arched gates of Gwanghwamun

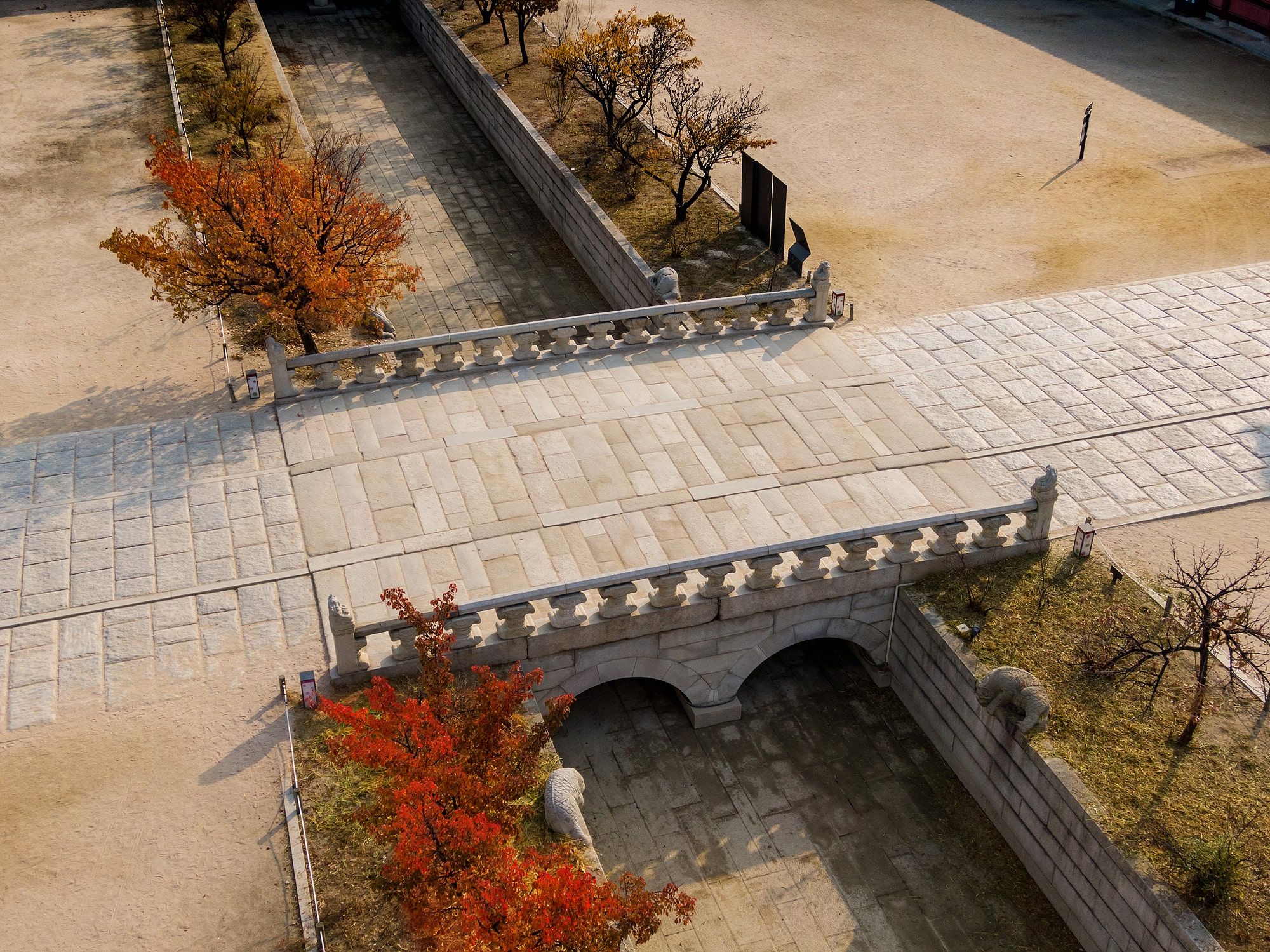
Yeongje Bridge of Gyeongbokgung Palace

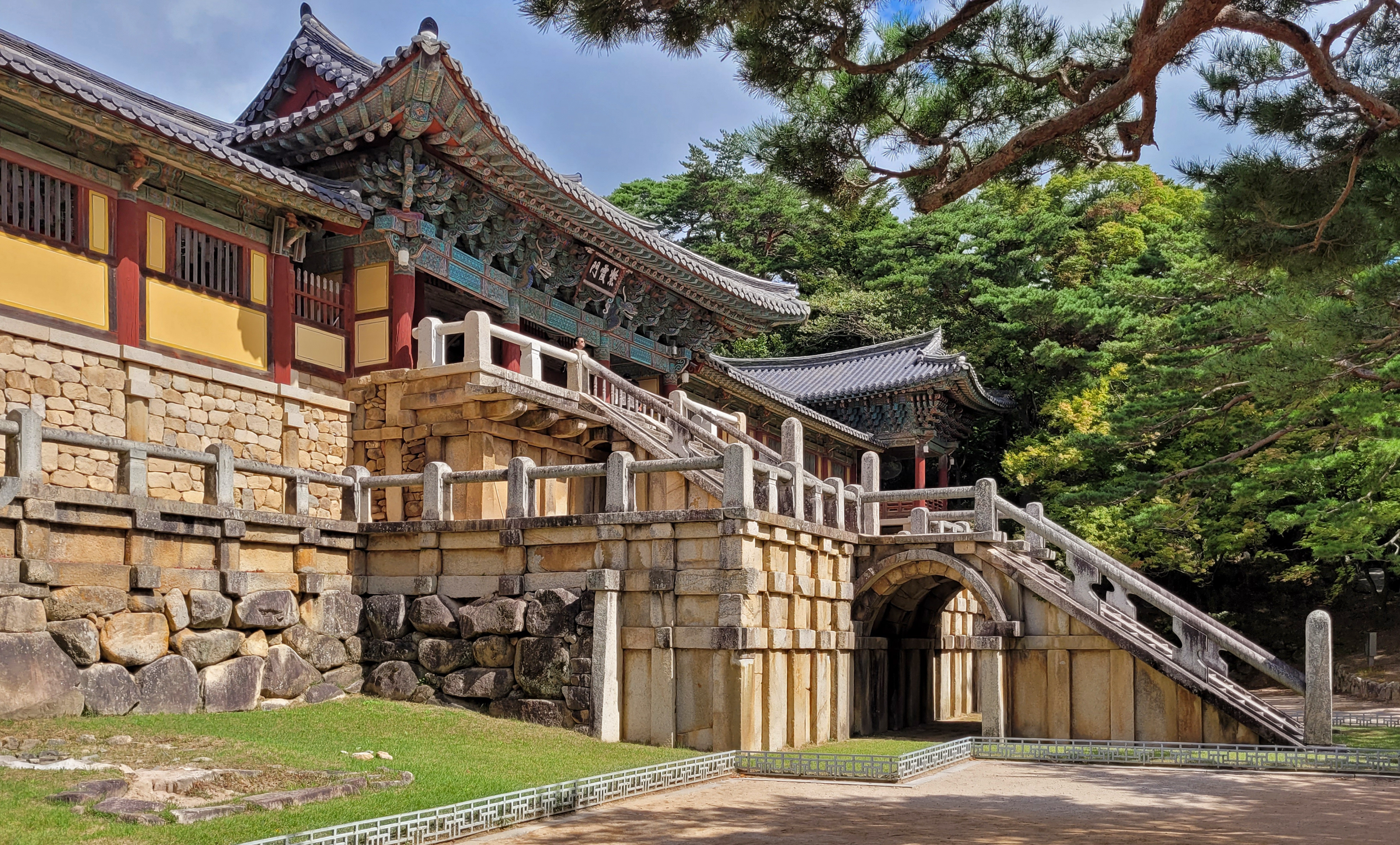
Baegun Bridge at Bulguksa

=== Pre-Columbian America ===
Mayan architecture utilized the corbel arches. The other Mesoamerican cultures used only the flat roofs with no arches whatsoever, although some researchers had suggested that both Maya and Aztec architects understood the concept of a true arch.

=== Revival of the trabeated system ===
The Iron Bridge, erected across the River Severn in Shropshire in 1779, was the first single-span arch bridge built of cast iron.

The 19th-century introduction of the wrought iron (and later steel) into construction changed the role of the arch. Due to the high tensile strength of new materials, relatively long lintels became possible, as was demonstrated by the tubular Britannia Bridge (Robert Stephenson, 1846-1850). A fervent proponent of the trabeated system, Alexander "Greek" Thomson, whose preference for lintels was originally based on aesthetic criteria, observed that the spans of this bridge are longer than that of any arch ever built, thus "the simple, unsophisticated stone lintel contains in its structure all the scientific appliances [...] used in the great tubular bridge. [...] Stonehenge is more scientifically constructed than York Minster." Use of arches in bridge construction continued (the Britannia Bridge was rebuilt in 1972 as a truss arch bridge), yet the steel frames and reinforced concrete frames mostly replaced the arches as the load-bearing elements in buildings.

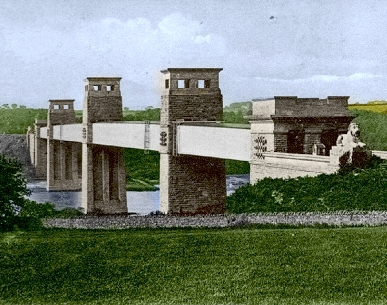
Original Britannia bridge (a colored postcard)

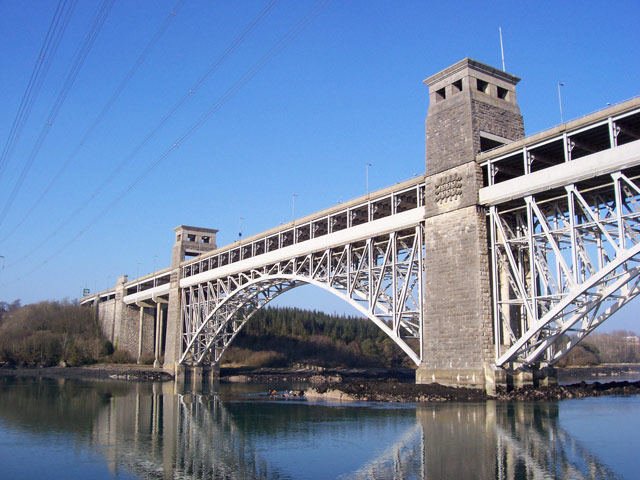
Britannia bridge (2008)

== Construction ==
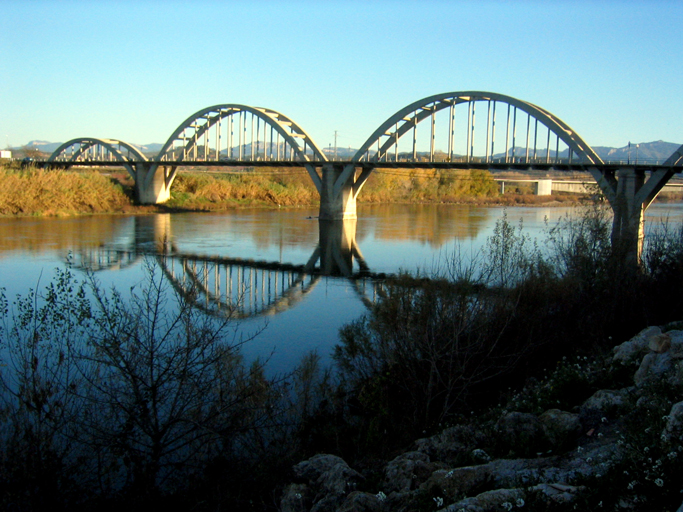
A series of parabolic arches on the Móra d'Ebre bridge, Catalonia, Spain (2005)

As a pure compression form, the utility of the arch is due to many building materials, including stone and unreinforced concrete, being strong under compression, but brittle when tensile stress is applied to them.

=== Masonry ===
The voussoirs may be wedge-shaped or rectangular; in the latter case, the wedge action is provided by the mortar. Thick arches built from rectangular bricks can use several concentric rings to keep the wedge-shaped mortar joints from becoming excessively wide at the extrados. Some arches combine brickwork with stone blocks at the springings and crown. Stone voussoirs may form a distinct arch ring or extend into the surrounding wall to fit its courses. Their accurate shaping and placement are crucial; mortar evens the contact surfaces and distributes pressure.

During construction, the ring is supported on temporary timber or framed work called centering (a form of falsework), which follows the intrados profile of the arch. For arches higher than head height, the centering may be combined with scaffolding or staging to provide working access. For key parts of an arch, see arch terminology.

After the keystone is set and the ring is seated, the centering is struck (lowered and removed). In mortared construction, removal is deferred until the mortar has gained adequate strength; modern guidance often recommends a minimum of seven days, with longer periods recommended in cold weather or when analysis requires it. To avoid shock and uneven load transfer, larger works are lowered uniformly using paired wedges, long compound wedges, or sand-boxes (sand jacks). Insufficient stiffness of the centering, premature striking, or construction faults can produce settlement or local failure as reactions shift toward the haunches and abutments.

=== Reinforced concrete ===
In reinforced concrete construction, the principle of the arch is used so as to benefit from the concrete's strength in resisting compressive stress. Where any other form of stress is raised, such as tensile or torsional stress, it has to be resisted by carefully placed reinforcement rods or fibres.

== Architectural styles ==
The type of arches (or absence of them) is one of the most prominent characteristics of an architectural style. For example, when Heinrich Hübsch, in the 19th century, tried to classify the architectural style, his "primary elements" were roof and supports, with the top-level basic types: trabeated (no arches) and arcuated (arch-based). His next division for the arcuated styles was based on the use of round and pointed arch shapes.

== Cultural references ==
The steady horizontal push of an arch against the abutments gave rise to a saying "the arch never sleeps", attributed to many sources, from Hindu to Arabs. This adage stresses that the arch carries "a seed of death" for itself and the structure containing it, a statement that can be made upon observation of the Roman ruins. The plot of The Nebuly Coat by J. Meade Falkner, inspired by a collapse of a tower at the Chichester Cathedral plays with the idea while dealing with the slow disintegration of a church building. Saoud explains the proverb by chain-like self-balancing of the horizontal and vertical forces in the arch and its "universal adaptability".

The metaphoric term bald arch has been used since at least the 19th century to designate a decaying arch or a plain, unadorned, arch. The former meaning is still used in the 21st century.

== See also ==
- Buttress
- Dome
- Flying arch
- Flying buttress
- Natural arch
- Order moulding
- Squinch, Trumpet arch
- Suspension bridge

== Sources ==
- Allen, Edward; Ochsendorf, John; West, Mark (2016). "Structural Intelligence In Flexible Materials" (PDF). The Fabric Formwork Book. Routledge. pp. 39–47. ISBN 9781315675022.
- American Technical Society (1908). Cyclopedia of Architecture, Carpentry and Building. Vol. 1. American technical society.
- Au, T. (1960). Elementary Structural Mechanics. Prentice-Hall civil engineering and engineering mechanics series. Prentice-Hall.
- Auld, Robert Campbell MacCombie (1929). The Burns We Love: A First Attempt to Obtain a Better Understanding of the Mission, Message and Meaning of the Poet of Humanity and of the Common Cause. Alloway Press.
- Balchin, Paul N. (19 February 2022). The Development of Cities in Northern and Central Italy: During the Renaissance. Routledge. ISBN 978-1-000-55078-8.
- Beall, C. (1987). Masonry Design and Detailing for Architects, Engineers, and Builders. McGraw-Hill. ISBN 978-0-07-004223-0.
- Benaim, Robert (14 December 2019). "The Design and Construction of Arches" ( (PDF)). The Design of Prestressed Concrete Bridges. CRC Press. ISBN 978-0-367-86572-6. Archived from the original on 2 February 2017.
- Bond, Francis (1905). Gothic Architecture in England: An Analysis of the Origin & Development of English Church Architecture from the Norman Conquest to the Dissolution of the Monasteries. Collections spéciales. B. T. Batsford.
- Boyd, Thomas D. (1978), "The Arch and the Vault in Greek Architecture", American Journal of Archaeology, 82 (1): 83–100, doi:10.2307/503797, JSTOR 503797, S2CID 194040597
- Bozzoni, C. (1991). "Arco". Enciclopedia dell'Arte Medievale (in Italian). Istituto dell'Enciclopedia Italiana.
- Bradley, R.A.; Gohnert, M. (2 September 2022). "Parametric study of the catenary dome under gravity load". Current Perspectives and New Directions in Mechanics, Modelling and Design of Structural Systems. London: CRC Press. doi:10.1201/9781003348443-130. ISBN 978-1-003-34844-3.
- The British Architect. British Architect. 1893.
- Calvo-López, José (2020). "Arches". Stereotomy. Mathematics and the Built Environment. Vol. 4. Cham: Springer International Publishing. pp. 265–329. doi:10.1007/978-3-030-43218-8_6. ISBN 978-3-030-43217-1. S2CID 241431231.
- Clarke, Michael; Clarke, Deborah (1 January 2010). The Concise Oxford Dictionary of Art Terms. Oxford University Press. doi:10.1093/acref/9780199569922.001.0001. ISBN 978-0-19-956992-2.
- Curl, James Stevens (2006). A Dictionary of Architecture and Landscape Architecture (2nd ed.). Oxford University Press. ISBN 978-0-19-860678-9.
- Davies, N.; Jokiniemi, E. (2008). Dictionary of Architecture and Building Construction. Taylor & Francis. ISBN 978-1-136-41025-3.
- Davies, N.; Jokiniemi, E. (2012). Architect's Illustrated Pocket Dictionary. Taylor & Francis. ISBN 978-1-136-44406-7.
- DeLaine, Janet (1990). "Structural experimentation: The lintel arch, corbel and tie in western Roman architecture". World Archaeology. 21 (3): 407–424. doi:10.1080/00438243.1990.9980116. ISSN 0043-8243. JSTOR 124838.
- "The Iron Bridge reopens to the public following £3.6 million project". English Heritage. 7 January 2019.
- Ewert, C. (1991). "Arco". Enciclopedia dell'Arte Medievale (in Italian). Istituto dell'Enciclopedia Italiana. Section "Islam".
- Franco, Fausto (1936). "Serliana". Enciclopedia Italiana (in Italian). Istituto dell'Enciclopedia Italiana.
- Galliazzo, Vittorio (1995), I ponti romani, vol. 1, Treviso: Edizioni Canova, ISBN 978-88-85066-66-3
- González, Genaro; Samper, Albert; Herrera, Blas (2018). "Classification by Type of the Arches in Gaudí's Palau Güell". Nexus Network Journal. 20 (1): 173–186. doi:10.1007/s00004-017-0355-7. hdl:20.500.11797/imarina5689818. ISSN 1590-5896.
- Gorse, Christopher; Johnston, David; Pritchard, Martin, eds. (2020). A Dictionary of Construction, Surveying and Civil Engineering. Oxford University Press. doi:10.1093/acref/9780198832485.001.0001. ISBN 978-0-19-883248-5.
- Graves, Margaret (2 July 2009). "Arches in Islamic architecture". Oxford Art Online. Oxford University Press. doi:10.1093/gao/9781884446054.article.t2082057. ISBN 978-1-884446-05-4.
- Harris, Cyril M. (28 February 2013). "Florentine arch". Illustrated Dictionary of Historic Architecture. Courier Corporation. ISBN 978-0-486-13211-2.
- Heyman, Jacques (2015). "Strainer arches". Construction History. 30 (2). The Construction History Society: 1–14. ISSN 0267-7768. JSTOR 44215905.
- Hourihane, Colum, ed. (2012). "Arch". The Grove Encyclopedia of Medieval Art and Architecture. Vol. 1. Oxford University Press. pp. 129–134. ISBN 978-0-19-539536-5.
- Hwang, Hak-ju (28 August 2026). "홍예교" [Arch bridge]. Encyclopedia of Korean Culture (in Korean). Academy of Korean Studies.
- Kim, Seon-suk (7 February 2023). "벽돌방무덤" [Brick-chamber tombs]. Encyclopedia of Korean Culture (in Korean). Academy of Korean Studies.
- Launaro, Alessandro (15 February 2024). Roman Urbanism in Italy: Recent Discoveries and New Directions. Oxbow Books. ISBN 979-8-88857-037-1.
- Lyttleton, Margaret (2003). "Trabeated construction". Grove Art Online. Oxford University Press. doi:10.1093/gao/9781884446054.article.t085978. ISBN 978-1-884446-05-4.
- Mallgrave, Harry Francis (1988). "Introduction". Modern Architecture: A Guidebook for His Students to this Field of Art. Texts & Documents. Getty Center for the History of Art and the Humanities. pp. 1–54. ISBN 978-0-226-86939-1.
- Mark, Robert (July–August 1996). "Architecture and Evolution" (PDF). American Scientist. 84 (4). Sigma Xi, The Scientific Research Honor Society: 383–389. Bibcode:1996AmSci..84..383M. JSTOR 29775710.
- Martinez Nespral, Fernando Luis (2023). "Islamic Presence in Latin American Architecture. Three Periods - Three Ways". In Rashid, H.; Petersen, K. (eds.). The Bloomsbury Handbook of Muslims and Popular Culture. Bloomsbury Handbooks. Bloomsbury Publishing. pp. 13–24. ISBN 978-1-350-14541-2.
- Nicolosi, Giuseppe; Niccoli, Raffaello; Cultrera, Giuseppe (1929). "Arco". Enciclopedia Italiana (in Italian). Istituto dell'Enciclopedia Italiana.
- O'Connor, Colin (1993), Roman Bridges, Cambridge University Press, ISBN 978-0-521-39326-3
- Osserman, Robert (February 2010). "Mathematics of the Gateway Arch" (PDF). Notices of the American Mathematical Society. 57 (2): 220–229. ISSN 0002-9920.
- Punmia, B.C.; Jain, Ashok Kumar; Jain, Arun Kumar (2005). Building Construction. Laxmi Publications. ISBN 978-81-7008-053-4.
- Quirarte, Jacinto (1989). "The Art and Architecture of Mesoamerica: An Overview". Latin American Art and Music: A Handbook for Teaching (PDF). Austin, TX: Texas Univ., Austin. Inst. of Latin American Studies. pp. 27–. ISBN 0-86728-012-3.
- Rasch, Jürgen (1985), "Die Kuppel in der römischen Architektur. Entwicklung, Formgebung, Konstruktion", Architectura, vol. 15, pp. 117–139
- Roth, Leland M (1993). Understanding Architecture: Its Elements History and Meaning. Oxford, UK: Westview Press. pp. 27–28. ISBN 978-0-06-430158-9.
- Royster, Paula D. (1 January 2021). Decolonizing Arts-Based Methodologies: Researching the African Diaspora. BRILL. doi:10.1163/9789004446120_004. ISBN 978-90-04-44612-0.* Saoud, Rabah (17 January 2002). "The Arch That Never Sleeps" (PDF). Muslim Heritage.
- Slivnik, L. (27 June 2013). "Three–hinged structures in a historical perspective". Structures and Architecture. CRC Press. pp. 1129–1136. doi:10.1201/b15267-153. ISBN 978-0-429-15935-0.
- Sturgis, Russell; Davis, Francis A. (2013). "Triangular Arch". Sturgis' Illustrated Dictionary of Architecture and Building: An Unabridged Reprint of the 1901-2 Edition. Dover Architecture. Dover Publications. ISBN 978-0-486-14840-3.
- "Arco". Enciclopedia on line (in Italian). Istituto dell'Enciclopedia Italiana.
- Vieitez, Fátima Otero (2020). "Past and Present for Arch Executions". Proceedings of ARCH 2019. Structural Integrity. Vol. 11. Cham: Springer International Publishing. pp. 604–611. doi:10.1007/978-3-030-29227-0_65. ISBN 978-3-030-29226-3. S2CID 211581407.
- Warren, John (1991). "Creswell's Use of the Theory of Dating by the Acuteness of the Pointed Arches in Early Muslim Architecture". Muqarnas. 8: 59–65. doi:10.2307/1523154. JSTOR 1523154.
- Wilkins, H.S.C. (1879). A treatise on mountain roads, live loads, and bridges. E. & F.N. Spon.
- Woodman, Francis; Bloom, Jonathan M. (2003). "Arch". Oxford Art Online. Oxford University Press. doi:10.1093/gao/9781884446054.article.t003657. ISBN 978-1-884446-05-4.
- Yun, Yong-hyeon (7 April 2014). "뛰어난 조형미와 구조 안정성의 으뜸 '홍예(虹霓)'" [The arch: outstanding aesthetic form and structural stability] (in Korean). Korea Cultural Heritage Foundation.
