= Shahrak, Iran =

Shahrak, Iran (Persian: شهرك) may refer to:

- Shahrak, Alborz
- Shahrak, alternate name of Kian, Chaharmahal and Bakhtiari, Iran
- Shahrak, East Azerbaijan
- Shahrak, Fars
- Shahrak, Hamadan
- Shahrak, Kurdistan
- Shahrak, Qazvin
- Shahrak, Khvaf, Razavi Khorasan Province
- Shahrak, Nishapur, Razavi Khorasan Province
- Shahrak, Irandegan, Khash County, Sistan and Baluchestan Province
- Shahrak, Kavandar, Khash County, Sistan and Baluchestan Province
- Shahrak, West Azerbaijan
- Shahrak, Zanjan
- Shahrak Rural District, in Ardabil Province
- Shahrak Rural District, in East Azerbaijan Province

== See also ==
- Shahrak, meaning "town", is a common element in Iranian place names
