= Battle of Sangan =

1727 Safavid Iran victory in Afghanistan

Sangan Expedition
- Part of Khorasan campaign of Nader Shah and Nader's Campaigns
Date	July–October 1727
Location	Sangan, Eastern Khorasan, Western Afghanistan
Result	Safavid victory
Territorial changes	Nader Shah secures the Khaf and Qa'in regions for the Safavids

Belligerents
Safavid loyalists	Abdali Afghans; Sangani Rebels

Commanders and leaders
Nader	Hussein Sultan of Sistan Malik Kalb 'Ali Malik Lutf 'Ali

Strength
800	7,000–8,000

Casualties and losses
Negligible	500 killed

The Battle of Sangan (Persian: نبرد سنگان, romanized: Nabard-e Sangān), was an engagement involving the Loyalist forces of Tahmasp II of Safavid Iran led by Nader and the Abdali Afghan tribes in and further beyond southern Khorasan in the autumn of 1727. This armed struggle was one of the initial battles between the resurgent Safavid cause and that of the Afghans. The engagement technically ended in a Safavid victory.

== Background ==
The Hotak invasion of Iran in 1722 had thrown Khorasan into chaos. It was reunified under the capable general, Tahmasp Qoli Khan (the eventual Nader Shah). Nader intended to consolidate his gains push further south and secure Sangan, Khaf and Behdadin. Sangan and Behdadin were ruled by a branch of the Herat Abdalis, who had rebelled against the Safavid government 11 years prior. In addition to this, a rebellion broke out in Qa'in that had to be taken care of. This rebellion was led by a Sistani chieftain named Husain Sultan, who was incited to revolt by Malek Mahmoud Sistani and was supported by some of Mahmoud's relatives (namely his brother Kalb 'Ali and his son Luft 'Ali).

== Battle ==
On 27 July or 5 August 1727 Nader Shah left Mashhad for Qa'in with 800 men. Nader soon forced Hussein Sultan to submit but Kalb 'Ali and Luft 'Ali escaped and fled to Ashraf at Isfahan. From there he marched via Esfedan towards Behdadin. The march towards Behdadin was tough, as Astarabadi puts it:

Those bandits fled precipitately from his army, which advanced, as the poet says, like a flame that consumes all before it. He came in a few days to one of those vast deserts of land, that are so frequent in Asia; where, mounted on a camel, with a lance in his hand, he led his soldiers without intermission, and held in common with them the toil and danger of these fatiguing marches.

As it was the middle of summer, water was scarce and his cannon kept sinking into the sand. Iran at this time didn't have many navigable waterways and the roads it did have weren't able to move heavy artillery long distances, which Nader would struggle with. However, he was able to retrieve the cannons from the sand through a coordinated effort by his men. Nader reached Behdadin on September 9 and stormed it. Soon after, the Sangani Afghans submitted to Nader. However, it turns out that they had feigned submission and Nader had to besiege Sangan in order to force them to submit.

During the siege, Nader was watching the artillery fire upon the fortress. However, a gunner accidentally set a nearby cannon off prematurely. The resulting shrapnel killed the gunner and a few other observers. Miraculously though Nader was unharmed as he backed away before the cannon exploded. On 22 September, 30 September, or 1 October Sangan fell to the Safavids, and the population was massacred for faking submission. However, an Abdali army numbering 7-8,000 men marched towards Sangan to relieve the fortress. When Nader heard of this, he sent a force to the village of Niazabad to face the Afghans. The battle lasted four days. Most of Nader's men were in trenches of 500 of his best cavalry would maneuver and fight off the Abdali troops. After the end of the 4 days the Abdali forces withdrew to Herat. However, Nader declined to pursue the Abdalis due to his insecure position, instead withdrawing with his army back to Mashhad.

== Aftermath ==
The expedition did not in itself provide any strategic gains as such and Nader withdrew into upper Khorasan to re-consolidate and plan an offensive against Herat.

== See also ==
- Military of Afsharid Iran
- Kandahar
- Afsharid dynasty
- Hotak dynasty
- Durrani dynasty
- Lurs

== Sources ==
- Axworthy, Michael The Sword of Persia: Nader Shah, from Tribal Warrior to Conquering Tyrant Hardcover 348 pages (26 July 2006) Publisher: I.B. Tauris Language: English ISBN 1-85043-706-8
- Lockhart, Laurence The Fall of the Safavi Dynasty and the Afghan Occupation of Persia Hardcover 584 pages (1958) Publisher: Cambridge University Press Language: English
- Lockhart, Lawrence (2011), Nadir Shah: A Critical Study Based Mainly Upon Contemporary Sources pp. 28–29.
- Mahdī Khān Astarābādī (1773) The History of the life of Nader Shah, King of Persia. Extracted from an Eastern manuscript, which was translated into French by the order of His Majesty the King of Denmark. pp. 12–13
- Nejatie, Sajjad (2017) The Pearl of Pearls: The Abdālī-Durrānī Confederacy and Its Transformation under Aḥmad Shāh, Durr-i Durrān pg.262
