= Chah-e Kandeh, Razavi Khorasan =

Village in Razavi Khorasan province, Iran

Chah-e Kandeh Persian: چاه كنده
- Village
- Location within Iran
- Coordinates: 34°16′14″N 59°32′03″E
- Country: Iran
- Province: Razavi Khorasan
- County: Khaf
- District: Jolgeh Zuzan
- Rural District: Keybar

Population (2016)
  - Total: 266
- Time zone: UTC+3:30 (IRST)

Chah-e Kandeh (Persian: چاه كنده) (Note: Also romanized as Chāh-e Kandeh; also known as Chah-e Rahim (چاه رحيم) and Chāh-e Raḩīm) is a village in Keybar Rural District of Jolgeh Zuzan District in Khaf County, Razavi Khorasan province, Iran.

== Demographics ==
=== Population ===
At the time of the 2006 National Census, the village's population was 194 in 48 households. The following census in 2011 counted 214 people in 54 households. The 2016 census measured the population of the village as 266 people in 69 households.
