= Qatar Gaz =

Qatar Gaz (Persian: قطارگز) may refer to:

- Qatar Gaz, Kerman
- Qatar Gaz, Razavi Khorasan
- Qatar Gaz, South Khorasan
