= Chah-e Gachi, Khaf =

Village in Razavi Khorasan province, Iran

Chah-e Gachi Persian: چاه گچي
- Village
- Location within Iran
- Coordinates: 34°14′29″N 59°32′58″E
- Country: Iran
- Province: Razavi Khorasan
- County: Khaf
- District: Jolgeh Zuzan
- Rural District: Keybar

Population (2016)
  - Total: 756
- Time zone: UTC+3:30 (IRST)

Chah-e Gachi (Persian: چاه گچي) (Note: Also romanized as Chāh-e Gachī) is a village in Keybar Rural District of Jolgeh Zuzan District in Khaf County, Razavi Khorasan province, Iran.

== Demographics ==
=== Population ===
At the time of the 2006 National Census, the village's population was 632 in 128 households. The following census in 2011 counted 663 people in 172 households. The 2016 census measured the population of the village as 756 people in 202 households.
