= Sijavand =

Village in Razavi Khorasan province, Iran

Sijavand Persian: سيجاوند
- Village
- Location within Iran
- Coordinates: 34°51′39″N 59°49′45″E
- Country: Iran
- Province: Razavi Khorasan
- County: Khaf
- District: Salami
- Rural District: Bala Khaf

Population (2016)
  - Total: 1,196
- Time zone: UTC+3:30 (IRST)

Sijavand (Persian: سيجاوند) (Note: Also romanized as Sījāvand; also known as Sajāwand and Sejāvand) is a village in Bala Khaf Rural District of Salami District in Khaf County, Razavi Khorasan province, Iran.

== Demographics ==
=== Population ===
At the time of the 2006 National Census, the village's population was 935 in 209 households. The following census in 2011 counted 1,180 people in 310 households. The 2016 census measured the population of the village as 1,196 people in 319 households.
