= Arg-e Qalandar =

Village in Razavi Khorasan province, Iran

Arg-e Qalandar Persian: ارگ قلندر
- Village
- Location within Iran
- Coordinates: 34°09′21″N 59°54′59″E
- Country: Iran
- Province: Razavi Khorasan
- County: Khaf
- District: Jolgeh Zuzan
- Rural District: Keybar

Population (2016)
  - Total: 525
- Time zone: UTC+3:30 (IRST)

Arg-e Qalandar (Persian: ارگ قلندر) (Note: Also romanized as Arg-e Qalandar; also known as Arg-e Mīr Qalandar) is a village in Keybar Rural District of Jolgeh Zuzan District in Khaf County, Razavi Khorasan province, Iran.

== Demographics ==
=== Population ===
At the time of the 2006 National Census, the village's population was 475 in 95 households. The following census in 2011 counted 413 people in 100 households. The 2016 census measured the population of the village as 525 people in 136 households.
