= Fadak, Razavi Khorasan =

Village in Razavi Khorasan province, Iran

Fadak Persian: فدك
- Village
- Location within Iran
- Coordinates: 34°45′38″N 59°49′32″E
- Country: Iran
- Province: Razavi Khorasan
- County: Khaf
- District: Salami
- Rural District: Bala Khaf

Population (2016)
  - Total: 211
- Time zone: UTC+3:30 (IRST)

Fadak (Persian: فدك) (Note: Also known as Fadūk and Fadvak) is a village in Bala Khaf Rural District of Salami District in Khaf County, Razavi Khorasan province, Iran.

== Demographics ==
=== Population ===
At the time of the 2006 National Census, the village's population was 189 in 55 households. The following census in 2011 counted 212 people in 71 households. The 2016 census measured the population of the village as 211 people in 67 households.
