= Shirgerd =

Village in Razavi Khorasan province, Iran

Shirgerd Persian: شيرگرد
- Village
- Country: Iran
- Province: Razavi Khorasan
- County: Khaf
- District: Jolgeh Zuzan
- Rural District: Keybar

Population (2016)
  - Total: 0
- Time zone: UTC+3:30 (IRST)

Shirgerd (Persian: شيرگرد) (Note: Also romanized as Shīrgerd) is a village in Keybar Rural District of Jolgeh Zuzan District in Khaf County, Razavi Khorasan province, Iran.

== Demographics ==
=== Population ===
At the time of the 2006 National Census, the village's population was 64 in 15 households. The following census in 2011 counted 39 people in 10 households. The 2016 census measured the population of the village as zero.
