= Hasanabad, Salami =

Village in Razavi Khorasan province, Iran

Hasanabad Persian: حسن اباد
- Village
- Location within Iran
- Coordinates: 34°43′26″N 59°53′23″E
- Country: Iran
- Province: Razavi Khorasan
- County: Khaf
- District: Salami
- Rural District: Salami

Population (2016)
  - Total: 1,018
- Time zone: UTC+3:30 (IRST)

Hasanabad (Persian: حسن اباد) (Note: Also romanized as Ḩasanābād; also known as Ḩoseynābād) is a village in Salami Rural District of Salami District in Khaf County, Razavi Khorasan province, Iran.

== Demographics ==
=== Population ===
At the time of the 2006 National Census, the village's population was 826 in 173 households. The following census in 2011 counted 895 people in 244 households. The 2016 census measured the population of the village as 1,018 people in 276 households.
