= Chah-e Matar =

Village in Razavi Khorasan province, Iran

Chah-e Matar Persian: چاه مطار
- Village
- Location within Iran
- Coordinates: 34°07′39″N 59°50′27″E
- Country: Iran
- Province: Razavi Khorasan
- County: Khaf
- District: Jolgeh Zuzan
- Rural District: Keybar

Population (2016)
  - Total: 114
- Time zone: UTC+3:30 (IRST)

Chah-e Matar (Persian: چاه مطار) (Note: Also romanized as Chāh Matār, Chāh Maţār, Chāh-e Matār, and Chāh-e Maţār) is a village in Keybar Rural District of Jolgeh Zuzan District in Khaf County, Razavi Khorasan province, Iran.

== Demographics ==
=== Population ===
At the time of the 2006 National Census, the village's population was 132 in 30 households. The following census in 2011 counted 146 people in 36 households. The 2016 census measured the population of the village as 114 people in 30 households.
