= Hamzar =

Village in Razavi Khorasan province, Iran

Hamzar Persian: همزارع
- Village
- Country: Iran
- Province: Razavi Khorasan
- County: Khaf
- District: Jolgeh Zuzan
- Rural District: Keybar

Population (2016)
  - Total: 225
- Time zone: UTC+3:30 (IRST)

Hamzar (Persian: همزارع) (Note: Also romanized as Hamzārʿ) is a village in Keybar Rural District of Jolgeh Zuzan District in Khaf County, Razavi Khorasan province, Iran.

== Demographics ==
=== Population ===
At the time of the 2006 National Census, the village's population was 143 in 31 households. The following census in 2011 counted 110 people in 23 households. The 2016 census measured the population of the village as 225 people in 56 households.
