= Chah-e Masileh =

Village in Razavi Khorasan province, Iran

Chah-e Masileh Persian: چاه مسيله
- Village
- Location within Iran
- Coordinates: 34°14′06″N 59°25′06″E
- Country: Iran
- Province: Razavi Khorasan
- County: Khaf
- District: Jolgeh Zuzan
- Rural District: Keybar

Population (2016)
  - Total: 192
- Time zone: UTC+3:30 (IRST)

Chah-e Masileh (Persian: چاه مسيله) (Note: Also romanized as Chah-e Masīleh) is a village in Keybar Rural District of Jolgeh Zuzan District in Khaf County, Razavi Khorasan province, Iran.

== Demographics ==
=== Population ===
At the time of the 2006 National Census, the village's population was 159 in 35 households. The following census in 2011 counted 160 people in 44 households. The 2016 census measured the population of the village as 192 people in 48 households.
