= Asadabad, Khaf =

Village in Razavi Khorasan province, Iran

Asadabad Persian: اسداباد
- Village
- Location within Iran
- Coordinates: 34°23′09″N 59°55′04″E
- Country: Iran
- Province: Razavi Khorasan
- County: Khaf
- District: Jolgeh Zuzan
- Rural District: Zuzan

Population (2016)
  - Total: 926
- Time zone: UTC+3:30 (IRST)

Asadabad (Persian: اسداباد) (Note: Also romanized as Asadābād; also known as Asadābād-e Pā’īn Khāf) is a village in Zuzan Rural District (Note: Formerly Jolgeh Zuzan Rural District) of Jolgeh Zuzan District in Khaf County, Razavi Khorasan province, Iran.

== Demographics ==
=== Population ===
At the time of the 2006 National Census, the village's population was 898 in 202 households. The following census in 2011 counted 944 people in 237 households. The 2016 census measured the population of the village as 926 people in 260 households.
