= Khaltabad-e Now Sazi =

Village in Razavi Khorasan province, Iran

Khaltabad-e Now Sazi Persian: خلطابادنوسازي
- Village
- Location within Iran
- Coordinates: 34°14′43″N 59°38′39″E
- Country: Iran
- Province: Razavi Khorasan
- County: Khaf
- District: Jolgeh Zuzan
- Rural District: Keybar

Population (2016)
  - Total: 749
- Time zone: UTC+3:30 (IRST)

Khaltabad-e Now Sazi (Persian: خلطابادنوسازي) (Note: Also romanized as Khalţābād-e Now Sāzī; also known as Khalţābād and Khelt Ābād) is a village in Keybar Rural District of Jolgeh Zuzan District in Khaf County, Razavi Khorasan province, Iran.

== Demographics ==
=== Population ===
At the time of the 2006 National Census, the village's population was 568 in 124 households. The following census in 2011 counted 608 people in 161 households. The 2016 census measured the population of the village as 749 people in 201 households.
