= Dardavey =

Village in Razavi Khorasan province, Iran

Dardavey Persian: دردوي
- Village
- Location within Iran
- Coordinates: 34°31′52″N 60°26′55″E
- Country: Iran
- Province: Razavi Khorasan
- County: Khaf
- District: Sangan
- Rural District: Pain Khaf

Population (2016)
  - Total: 58
- Time zone: UTC+3:30 (IRST)

Dardavey (Persian: دردوي) is a village in Pain Khaf Rural District of Sangan District in Khaf County, Razavi Khorasan province, Iran.

== Demographics ==
=== Population ===
At the time of the 2006 National Census, the village's population was 40 in 10 households. The following census in 2011 counted 95 people in 22 households. The 2016 census measured the population of the village as 58 people in 16 households.
