= Biasabad-e Now Sazi =

Village in Razavi Khorasan province, Iran

Biasabad-e Now Sazi Persian: بياسابادنوسازي
- Village
- Location within Iran
- Coordinates: 34°18′29″N 60°02′58″E
- Country: Iran
- Province: Razavi Khorasan
- County: Khaf
- District: Jolgeh Zuzan
- Rural District: Zuzan

Population (2016)
  - Total: 1,562
- Time zone: UTC+3:30 (IRST)

Biasabad-e Now Sazi (Persian: بياسابادنوسازي) (Note: Also romanized as Bīāsābād-e Now Sāzī; also known as Bīāsābād and Bayās Ābād) is a village in Zuzan Rural District (Note: Formerly Jolgeh Zuzan Rural District) of Jolgeh Zuzan District in Khaf County, Razavi Khorasan province, Iran.

== Demographics ==
=== Population ===
At the time of the 2006 National Census, the village's population was 1,200 in 226 households. The following census in 2011 counted 1,336 people in 361 households. The 2016 census measured the population of the village as 1,562 people in 410 households.
