= Hezarkhusheh =

Village in Razavi Khorasan province, Iran

Hezarkhusheh Persian: هزارخوشه
- Village
- Location within Iran
- Coordinates: 34°44′36″N 59°52′14″E
- Country: Iran
- Province: Razavi Khorasan
- County: Khaf
- District: Salami
- Rural District: Bala Khaf

Population (2016)
  - Total: 773
- Time zone: UTC+3:30 (IRST)

Hezarkhusheh (Persian: هزارخوشه) (Note: Also romanized as Hezārkhūsheh) is a village in Bala Khaf Rural District of Salami District in Khaf County, Razavi Khorasan province, Iran.

== Demographics ==
=== Population ===
At the time of the 2006 National Census, the village's population was 502 in 116 households. The following census in 2011 counted 605 people in 149 households. The 2016 census measured the population of the village as 773 people in 199 households.
