= Bagh-e Bakhshi =

Village in Razavi Khorasan province, Iran

Bagh-e Bakhshi Persian: باغ بخشي
- Village
- Location within Iran
- Coordinates: 34°27′10″N 59°31′36″E
- Country: Iran
- Province: Razavi Khorasan
- County: Khaf
- District: Jolgeh Zuzan
- Rural District: Zuzan

Population (2016)
  - Total: 1,604
- Time zone: UTC+3:30 (IRST)

Bagh-e Bakhshi (Persian: باغ بخشي) (Note: Also romanized as Bāgh-e Bakhshī) is a village in Zuzan Rural District (Note: Formerly Jolgeh Zuzan Rural District) of Jolgeh Zuzan District in Khaf County, Razavi Khorasan province, Iran.

== Demographics ==
=== Population ===
At the time of the 2006 National Census, the village's population was 1,391 in 288 households. The following census in 2011 counted 1,422 people in 346 households. The 2016 census measured the population of the village as 1,604 people in 402 households.
