= Chamanabad =

Village in Razavi Khorasan province, Iran

Chamanabad Persian: چمن اباد
- Village
- Location within Iran
- Coordinates: 34°49′42″N 59°48′18″E
- Country: Iran
- Province: Razavi Khorasan
- County: Khaf
- District: Salami
- Rural District: Bala Khaf

Population (2016)
  - Total: 1,804
- Time zone: UTC+3:30 (IRST)

Chamanabad (Persian: چمن اباد) (Note: Also romanized as Chamanābād) is a village in, and the capital of, Bala Khaf Rural District in Salami District of Khaf County, Razavi Khorasan province, Iran.

== Demographics ==
=== Population ===
At the time of the 2006 National Census, the village's population was 1,561 in 408 households. The following census in 2011 counted 1,981 people in 507 households. The 2016 census measured the population of the village as 1,804 people in 480 households.
