= Hasanabad, Jolgeh Zuzan =

Village in Razavi Khorasan province, Iran

Hasanabad Persian: حسن اباد
- Village
- Location within Iran
- Coordinates: 34°14′42″N 59°58′06″E
- Country: Iran
- Province: Razavi Khorasan
- County: Khaf
- District: Jolgeh Zuzan
- Rural District: Keybar

Population (2016)
  - Total: 681
- Time zone: UTC+3:30 (IRST)

Hasanabad (Persian: حسن اباد) (Note: Also romanized as Ḩasanābād) is a village in Keybar Rural District of Jolgeh Zuzan District in Khaf County, Razavi Khorasan province, Iran.

== Demographics ==
=== Population ===
At the time of the 2006 National Census, the village's population was 615 in 133 households. The following census in 2011 counted 593 people in 155 households. The 2016 census measured the population of the village as 681 people in 179 households.
