= Kheyrabad, Khaf =

Village in Razavi Khorasan province, Iran

Kheyrabad Persian: خيراباد
- Village
- Location within Iran
- Coordinates: 34°50′47″N 60°00′29″E
- Country: Iran
- Province: Razavi Khorasan
- County: Khaf
- District: Salami
- Rural District: Bala Khaf

Population (2016)
  - Total: 1,252
- Time zone: UTC+3:30 (IRST)

Kheyrabad (Persian: خيراباد) (Note: Also romanized as Kheyrābād) is a village in Bala Khaf Rural District of Salami District in Khaf County, Razavi Khorasan province, Iran.

== Demographics ==
=== Population ===
At the time of the 2006 National Census, the village's population was 1,094 in 245 households. The following census in 2011 counted 1,188 people in 290 households. The 2016 census measured the population of the village as 1,252 people in 322 households.
