= Farahabad, Khaf =

Village in Razavi Khorasan province, Iran

Farahabad Persian: فرح اباد
- Village
- Location within Iran
- Coordinates: 34°47′02″N 59°50′51″E
- Country: Iran
- Province: Razavi Khorasan
- County: Khaf
- District: Salami
- Rural District: Bala Khaf

Population (2016)
  - Total: 626
- Time zone: UTC+3:30 (IRST)

Farahabad (Persian: فرح اباد) (Note: Also romanized as Faraḩābād; also known as Rūḥābād (روح اباد)) is a village in Bala Khaf Rural District of Salami District in Khaf County, Razavi Khorasan province, Iran.

== Demographics ==
=== Population ===
At the time of the 2006 National Census, the village's population was 615 in 145 households. The following census in 2011 counted 651 people in 157 households. The 2016 census measured the population of the village as 626 people in 176 households.
