= Abbasabad, Khaf =

Village in Razavi Khorasan province, Iran

Abbasabad Persian: عباس اباد
- Village
- Location within Iran
- Coordinates: 34°48′15″N 59°47′21″E
- Country: Iran
- Province: Razavi Khorasan
- County: Khaf
- District: Salami
- Rural District: Bala Khaf

Population (2016)
  - Total: 1,324
- Time zone: UTC+3:30 (IRST)

Abbasabad (Persian: عباس اباد) (Note: Also romanized as ‘Abbāsābād) is a village in Bala Khaf Rural District of Salami District in Khaf County, Razavi Khorasan province, Iran.

== Demographics ==
=== Population ===
At the time of the 2006 National Census, the village's population was 1,181 in 274 households. The following census in 2011 counted 1,298 people in 335 households. The 2016 census measured the population of the village as 1,324 people in 361 households.
