= Boneyabad, Khaf =

Village in Razavi Khorasan province, Iran

Boneyabad Persian: بنياباد
- Village
- Location within Iran
- Coordinates: 34°04′49″N 59°52′34″E
- Country: Iran
- Province: Razavi Khorasan
- County: Khaf
- District: Jolgeh Zuzan
- Rural District: Keybar

Population (2016)
  - Total: 719
- Time zone: UTC+3:30 (IRST)

Boneyabad (Persian: بنياباد) (Note: Also romanized as Beneyābād, Boneyābād, Bonīābād, and Bonyābād; also known as Bohnābād, Buhnābād, and Buniabad) is a village in Keybar Rural District of Jolgeh Zuzan District in Khaf County, Razavi Khorasan province, Iran.

== Demographics ==
=== Population ===
At the time of the 2006 National Census, the village's population was 685 in 152 households. The following census in 2011 counted 686 people in 166 households. The 2016 census measured the population of the village as 719 people in 204 households.
