= Khalilabad, Khaf =

Village in Razavi Khorasan province, Iran

Khalilabad Persian: خليل اباد
- Village
- Location within Iran
- Coordinates: 34°47′26″N 59°51′01″E
- Country: Iran
- Province: Razavi Khorasan
- County: Khaf
- District: Salami
- Rural District: Bala Khaf

Population (2016)
  - Total: 1,080
- Time zone: UTC+3:30 (IRST)

Khalilabad (Persian: خليل اباد) (Note: Also romanized as Khalīlābād) is a village in Bala Khaf Rural District of Salami District in Khaf County, Razavi Khorasan province, Iran.

== Demographics ==
=== Population ===
At the time of the 2006 National Census, the village's population was 853 in 173 households. The following census in 2011 counted 1,068 people in 238 households. The 2016 census measured the population of the village as 1,080 people in 270 households.
