= Ebrahimi, Razavi Khorasan =

Village in Razavi Khorasan province, Iran

Ebrahimi Persian: ابراهيمي
- Village
- Location within Iran
- Coordinates: 34°17′08″N 59°52′21″E
- Country: Iran
- Province: Razavi Khorasan
- County: Khaf
- District: Jolgeh Zuzan
- Rural District: Keybar

Population (2016)
  - Total: 793
- Time zone: UTC+3:30 (IRST)

Ebrahimi (Persian: ابراهيمي) (Note: Also romanized as Ebrāhīmī and Ibrāhīmī) is a village in, and the capital of, Keybar Rural District of Jolgeh Zuzan District in Khaf County, Razavi Khorasan province, Iran.

== Demographics ==
=== Population ===
At the time of the 2006 National Census, the village's population was 763 in 169 households. The following census in 2011 counted 694 people in 171 households. The 2016 census measured the population of the village as 793 people in 209 households.
