= Valiabad, Razavi Khorasan =

Village in Razavi Khorasan province, Iran

Valiabad Persian: ولي اباد
- Village
- Location within Iran
- Coordinates: 34°50′09″N 59°48′32″E
- Country: Iran
- Province: Razavi Khorasan
- County: Khaf
- District: Salami
- Rural District: Bala Khaf

Population (2016)
  - Total: 1,169
- Time zone: UTC+3:30 (IRST)

Valiabad (Persian: ولي اباد) (Note: Also romanized as Valīābād) is a village in Bala Khaf Rural District of Salami District in Khaf County, Razavi Khorasan province, Iran.

== Demographics ==
=== Population ===
At the time of the 2006 National Census, the village's population was 914 in 198 households. The following census in 2011 counted 886 people in 242 households. The 2016 census measured the population of the village as 1,169 people in 332 households.
