= Nahur =

Nahur may refer to:

- Nahur, India, a suburb of Mumbai
- Nahur, Iran, a village near Khaf
- Nahur, Oman, a village near Salalah
- Nahur (animal), Nepalese name for the bharal, a type of bovid
