= Mahabad-e Jadid =

Village in Razavi Khorasan province, Iran

Mahabad-e Jadid Persian: مهابادجديد
- Village
- Location within Iran
- Country: Iran
- Province: Razavi Khorasan
- County: Khaf
- District: Jolgeh Zuzan
- Rural District: Zuzan

Population (2016)
  - Total: 233
- Time zone: UTC+3:30 (IRST)

Mahabad-e Jadid (Persian: مهابادجديد) (Note: Also romanized as Mahābād-e Jadīd; also known as Mahābād) is a village in Zuzan Rural District (Note: Formerly Jolgeh Zuzan Rural District) of Jolgeh Zuzan District in Khaf County, Razavi Khorasan province, Iran.

== Demographics ==
=== Population ===
At the time of the 2006 National Census, the village's population was 300 in 69 households. The following census in 2011 counted 274 people in 73 households. The 2016 census measured the population of the village as 233 people in 66 households.
