= Mehrabad, Jolgeh Zuzan =

Village in Razavi Khorasan province, Iran

Mehrabad Persian: مهراباد
- Village
- Location within Iran
- Coordinates: 34°06′30″N 59°53′39″E
- Country: Iran
- Province: Razavi Khorasan
- County: Khaf
- District: Jolgeh Zuzan
- Rural District: Keybar

Population (2016)
  - Total: 357
- Time zone: UTC+3:30 (IRST)

Mehrabad (Persian: مهراباد) (Note: Also romanized as Mehrābād; also known as Mihrābād) is a village in Keybar Rural District of Jolgeh Zuzan District in Khaf County, Razavi Khorasan province, Iran.

== Demographics ==
=== Population ===
At the time of the 2006 National Census, the village's population was 388 in 79 households. The following census in 2011 counted 377 people in 86 households. The 2016 census measured the population of the village as 357 people in 97 households.
