= Boqsani, Sangan =

Village in Razavi Khorasan province, Iran

Boqsani Persian: بقصاني
- Village
- Location within Iran
- Coordinates: 34°14′59″N 60°03′54″E
- Country: Iran
- Province: Razavi Khorasan
- County: Khaf
- District: Sangan
- Rural District: Bostan

Population (2016)
  - Total: 11
- Time zone: UTC+3:30 (IRST)

Boqsani (Persian: بقصاني) (Note: Also romanized as Boqşānī; also known as Bokhsānī, Boqşānī-ye ‘Olyā (بقصاني عليا), and Qaşanī) is a village in Bostan Rural District of Sangan District in Khaf County, Razavi Khorasan province, Iran.

== Demographics ==
=== Population ===
At the time of the 2006 National Census, the village's population was 29 in 10 households. The following census in 2011 counted 13 people in five households. The 2016 census measured the population of the village as 11 people in four households.
