= Mazhnabad =

Village in Razavi Khorasan province, Iran

Mazhnabad Persian: مژن اباد
- Village
- Location within Iran
- Coordinates: 34°06′47″N 60°05′43″E
- Country: Iran
- Province: Razavi Khorasan
- County: Khaf
- District: Sangan
- Rural District: Bostan

Population (2016)
  - Total: 2,450
- Time zone: UTC+3:30 (IRST)

Mazhnabad (Persian: مژن اباد) (Note: Also romanized as Mazhan Abad, Mazhnābād, and Mozhnābād; also known as Majnābād and Mijnābād) is a village in Bostan Rural District of Sangan District in Khaf County, Razavi Khorasan province, Iran.

== Demographics ==
=== Population ===
At the time of the 2006 National Census, the village's population was 1,854 in 371 households. The following census in 2011 counted 2,192 people in 466 households. The 2016 census measured the population of the village as 2,450 people in 601 households.
