= Sarab, Khaf =

Village in Razavi Khorasan province, Iran

Sarab Persian: سراب
- Village
- Location within Iran
- Coordinates: 34°43′40″N 60°02′48″E
- Country: Iran
- Province: Razavi Khorasan
- County: Khaf
- District: Salami
- Rural District: Salami

Population (2016)
  - Total: 790
- Time zone: UTC+3:30 (IRST)

Sarab (Persian: سراب) (Note: Also romanized as Sarāb) is a village in Salami Rural District of Salami District in Khaf County, Razavi Khorasan province, Iran.

== Demographics ==
=== Population ===
At the time of the 2006 National Census, the village's population was 647 in 121 households. The following census in 2011 counted 712 people in 164 households. The 2016 census measured the population of the village as 790 people in 229 households.
