= Aliabad-e Jadid =

Village in Razavi Khorasan province, Iran

Aliabad-e Jadid Persian: علي ابادجديد
- Village
- Location within Iran
- Coordinates: 34°45′20″N 59°51′17″E
- Country: Iran
- Province: Razavi Khorasan
- County: Khaf
- District: Salami
- Rural District: Bala Khaf

Population (2016)
  - Total: 748
- Time zone: UTC+3:30 (IRST)

Aliabad-e Jadid (Persian: علي ابادجديد) (Note: Also romanized as ‘Alīābād-e Jadīd; also known as ‘Alīābād) is a village in Bala Khaf Rural District of Salami District in Khaf County, Razavi Khorasan province, Iran.

== Demographics ==
=== Population ===
At the time of the 2006 National Census, the village's population was 570 in 118 households. The following census in 2011 counted 606 people in 158 households. The 2016 census measured the population of the village as 748 people in 193 households.
