= Chahar Deh, Razavi Khorasan =

Village in Razavi Khorasan province, Iran

Chahar Deh Persian: چهارده
- Village
- Location within Iran
- Coordinates: 34°41′39″N 60°02′03″E
- Country: Iran
- Province: Razavi Khorasan
- County: Khaf
- District: Salami
- Rural District: Salami

Population (2016)
  - Total: 1,618
- Time zone: UTC+3:30 (IRST)

Chahar Deh (Persian: چهارده) (Note: Also romanized as Chahār Deh) is a village in Salami Rural District of Salami District in Khaf County, Razavi Khorasan province, Iran.

== Demographics ==
=== Population ===
At the time of the 2006 National Census, the village's population was 1,292 in 233 households. The following census in 2011 counted 1,449 people in 314 households. The 2016 census measured the population of the village as 1,618 people in 376 households.
