= Karyun =

Village in Razavi Khorasan province, Iran

Karyun Persian: كاريون
- Village
- Location within Iran
- Coordinates: 34°08′01″N 60°06′46″E
- Country: Iran
- Province: Razavi Khorasan
- County: Khaf
- District: Sangan
- Rural District: Bostan

Population (2016)
  - Total: 806
- Time zone: UTC+3:30 (IRST)

Karyun (Persian: كاريون) (Note: Also romanized as Kāryūn; also known as Karpūn and Kāryām) is a village in Bostan Rural District of Sangan District in Khaf County, Razavi Khorasan province, Iran.

== Demographics ==
=== Population ===
At the time of the 2006 National Census, the village's population was 636 in 122 households. The following census in 2011 counted 662 people in 161 households. The 2016 census measured the population of the village as 806 people in 178 households.
