= Deh-e Khatib Jadid =

Village in Razavi Khorasan province, Iran

Deh-e Khatib Jadid Persian: ده خطيب جديد
- Village
- Location within Iran
- Coordinates: 34°06′36″N 59°45′14″E
- Country: Iran
- Province: Razavi Khorasan
- County: Khaf
- District: Jolgeh Zuzan
- Rural District: Keybar

Population (2016)
  - Total: 508
- Time zone: UTC+3:30 (IRST)

Deh-e Khatib Jadid (Persian: ده خطيب جديد) (Note: Also romanized as Deh-e Khaţīb Jadīd; also known as Deh Khaţīb and Deh-e Khaţīb) is a village in Keybar Rural District of Jolgeh Zuzan District in Khaf County, Razavi Khorasan province, Iran.

== Demographics ==
=== Population ===
At the time of the 2006 National Census, the village's population was 467 in 102 households. The following census in 2011 counted 425 people in 103 households. The 2016 census measured the population of the village as 508 people in 134 households.
