= Razdab =

Village in Razavi Khorasan province, Iran

Razdab Persian: رزداب
- Village
- Location within Iran
- Coordinates: 34°48′36″N 60°07′24″E
- Country: Iran
- Province: Razavi Khorasan
- County: Khaf
- District: Salami
- Rural District: Salami

Population (2016)
  - Total: 1,880
- Time zone: UTC+3:30 (IRST)

Razdab (Persian: رزداب) (Note: Also romanized as Razdāb and Rezdāb) is a village in Salami Rural District of Salami District in Khaf County, Razavi Khorasan province, Iran.

== Demographics ==
=== Population ===
At the time of the 2006 National Census, the village's population was 1,576 in 338 households. The following census in 2011 counted 1,832 people in 392 households. The 2016 census measured the population of the village as 1,880 people in 434 households, the most populous in its rural district.
