= Miyanrudi =

Village in Razavi Khorasan province, Iran

Miyanrudi Persian: ميانرودي
- Village
- Location within Iran
- Coordinates: 34°46′16″N 59°51′53″E
- Country: Iran
- Province: Razavi Khorasan
- County: Khaf
- District: Salami
- Rural District: Bala Khaf

Population (2016)
  - Total: 157
- Time zone: UTC+3:30 (IRST)

Miyanrudi (Persian: ميانرودي) (Note: Also romanized as Mīyānrūdī) is a village in Bala Khaf Rural District of Salami District in Khaf County, Razavi Khorasan province, Iran.

== Demographics ==
=== Population ===
The village did not appear in the 2006 National Census. The following census in 2011 counted 116 people in 30 households. The 2016 census measured the population of the village as 157 people in 51 households.
