= Hajjiabad, Khaf =

Village in Razavi Khorasan province, Iran

Hajjiabad Persian: حاجي اباد
- Village
- Location within Iran
- Coordinates: 34°46′23″N 59°51′10″E
- Country: Iran
- Province: Razavi Khorasan
- County: Khaf
- District: Salami
- Rural District: Bala Khaf

Population (2016)
  - Total: 309
- Time zone: UTC+3:30 (IRST)

Hajjiabad (Persian: حاجي اباد) (Note: Also romanized as Ḩājjīābād) is a village in Bala Khaf Rural District of Salami District in Khaf County, Razavi Khorasan province, Iran.

== Demographics ==
=== Population ===
At the time of the 2006 National Census, the village's population was 251 in 63 households. The following census in 2011 counted 303 people in 77 households. The 2016 census measured the population of the village as 309 people in 91 households.
