= Chah-e Khesht =

Village in Razavi Khorasan province, Iran

Chah-e Khesht Persian: چاه خشت
- Village
- Location within Iran
- Coordinates: 34°09′22″N 59°33′59″E
- Country: Iran
- Province: Razavi Khorasan
- County: Khaf
- District: Jolgeh Zuzan
- Rural District: Keybar

Population (2016)
  - Total: 275
- Time zone: UTC+3:30 (IRST)

Chah-e Khesht (Persian: چاه خشت) (Note: Also romanized as Chāh-e Khesht) is a village in Keybar Rural District of Jolgeh Zuzan District in Khaf County, Razavi Khorasan province, Iran.

== Demographics ==
=== Population ===
At the time of the 2006 National Census, the village's population was 260 in 59 households. The following census in 2011 counted 284 people in 70 households. The 2016 census measured the population of the village as 275 people in 75 households.
