= Ghazanfari =

Village in Razavi Khorasan province, Iran

Ghazanfari Persian: غضنفري
- Village
- Location within Iran
- Coordinates: 34°10′56″N 59°50′39″E
- Country: Iran
- Province: Razavi Khorasan
- County: Khaf
- District: Jolgeh Zuzan
- Rural District: Keybar

Population (2016)
  - Total: 104
- Time zone: UTC+3:30 (IRST)

Ghazanfari (Persian: غضنفري) (Note: Also romanized as Ghaẕanfarī) is a village in Keybar Rural District of Jolgeh Zuzan District in Khaf County, Razavi Khorasan province, Iran.

== Demographics ==
=== Population ===
At the time of the 2006 National Census, the village's population was 194 in 48 households. The following census in 2011 counted 51 people in 15 households. The 2016 census measured the population of the village as 104 people in 29 households.
