= Qaleh-ye Now, Khaf =

Village in Razavi Khorasan province, Iran

Qaleh-ye Now Persian: قلعه نو
- Village
- Location within Iran
- Coordinates: 34°45′55″N 60°01′03″E
- Country: Iran
- Province: Razavi Khorasan
- County: Khaf
- District: Salami
- Rural District: Salami

Population (2016)
  - Total: 931
- Time zone: UTC+3:30 (IRST)

Qaleh-ye Now (Persian: قلعه نو) (Note: Also romanized as Qal‘eh Now and Qal‘eh-ye Now; also known as Kaleh Nau, Qal‘eh-i-Nau, and Qal‘eh-ye Hendū) is a village in Salami Rural District of Salami District in Khaf County, Razavi Khorasan province, Iran.

== Demographics ==
=== Population ===
At the time of the 2006 National Census, the village's population was 681 in 135 households. The following census in 2011 counted 793 people in 194 households. The 2016 census measured the population of the village as 931 people in 250 households.
