= Barkad Jadid =

Village in Razavi Khorasan province, Iran

Barkad Jadid Persian: بركاڈجديد
- Village
- Location within Iran
- Coordinates: 34°04′21″N 59°41′16″E
- Country: Iran
- Province: Razavi Khorasan
- County: Khaf
- District: Jolgeh Zuzan
- Rural District: Keybar

Population (2016)
  - Total: 537
- Time zone: UTC+3:30 (IRST)

Barkad Jadid (Persian: بركاڈجديد) (Note: Also romanized as Barḵāɖ Jadīd; also known as Barkāh) is a village in Keybar Rural District of Jolgeh Zuzan District in Khaf County, Razavi Khorasan province, Iran.

== Demographics ==
=== Population ===
At the time of the 2006 National Census, the village's population was 452 in 97 households. The following census in 2011 counted 446 people in 107 households. The 2016 census measured the population of the village as 537 people in 140 households.
