= Salman, Razavi Khorasan =

Village in Razavi Khorasan province, Iran

Salman Persian: سلمان
- Village
- Location within Iran
- Coordinates: 34°47′40″N 59°50′52″E
- Country: Iran
- Province: Razavi Khorasan
- County: Khaf
- District: Salami
- Rural District: Bala Khaf

Population (2016)
  - Total: 986
- Time zone: UTC+3:30 (IRST)

Salman (Persian: سلمان) (Note: Also romanized as Salmān) is a village in Bala Khaf Rural District of Salami District in Khaf County, Razavi Khorasan province, Iran.

== Demographics ==
=== Population ===
At the time of the 2006 National Census, the village's population was 693 in 150 households. The following census in 2011 counted 920 people in 233 households. The 2016 census measured the population of the village as 986 people in 260 households.
