= Seyyedabad, Khaf =

Village in Razavi Khorasan province, Iran

Seyyedabad Persian: صيداباد
- Village
- Location within Iran
- Coordinates: 34°50′35″N 59°46′48″E
- Country: Iran
- Province: Razavi Khorasan
- County: Khaf
- District: Salami
- Rural District: Bala Khaf

Population (2016)
  - Total: 1,000
- Time zone: UTC+3:30 (IRST)

Seyyedabad (Persian: صيداباد) (Note: Also romanized as Şeydābād and Seyyedābād) is a village in Bala Khaf Rural District of Salami District in Khaf County, Razavi Khorasan province, Iran.

== Demographics ==
=== Population ===
At the time of the 2006 National Census, the village's population was 764 in 145 households. The following census in 2011 counted 896 people in 207 households. The 2016 census measured the population of the village as 1,000 people in 253 households.
