= Garyab =

Village in Razavi Khorasan province, Iran

Garyab Persian: گرياب
- Village
- Country: Iran
- Province: Razavi Khorasan
- County: Khaf
- District: Sangan
- Rural District: Pain Khaf

Population (2016)
  - Total: 160
- Time zone: UTC+3:30 (IRST)

Garyab (Persian: گرياب) (Note: Also romanized as Garyāb) is a village in Pain Khaf Rural District of Sangan District in Khaf County, Razavi Khorasan province, Iran.

== Demographics ==
=== Population ===
At the time of the 2006 National Census, the village's population was 151 in 38 households. The following census in 2011 counted 181 people in 44 households. The 2016 census measured the population of the village as 160 people in 45 households.
