= Bandivan, Iran =

Village in Razavi Khorasan province, Iran

Bandivan Persian: بنديوان
- Village
- Location within Iran
- Coordinates: 34°46′45″N 60°05′27″E
- Country: Iran
- Province: Razavi Khorasan
- County: Khaf
- District: Salami
- Rural District: Salami

Population (2016)
  - Total: 1,385
- Time zone: UTC+3:30 (IRST)

Bandivan (Persian: بنديوان) (Note: Also romanized as Bandīvān; also known as Mandīvān) is a village in Salami Rural District of Salami District in Khaf County, Razavi Khorasan province, Iran.

== Demographics ==
=== Population ===
At the time of the 2006 National Census, the village's population was 955 in 190 households. The following census in 2011 counted 1,144 people in 253 households. The 2016 census measured the population of the village as 1,385 people in 312 households.
