= Chah-e Zul =

Village in Razavi Khorasan province, Iran

Chah-e Zul Persian: چاه زول
- Village
- Location within Iran
- Coordinates: 34°04′27″N 60°12′37″E
- Country: Iran
- Province: Razavi Khorasan
- County: Khaf
- District: Sangan
- Rural District: Bostan

Population (2016)
  - Total: 1,122
- Time zone: UTC+3:30 (IRST)

Chah-e Zul (Persian: چاه زول) (Note: Also romanized as Chāh-e Zūl) is a village in Bostan Rural District of Sangan District in Khaf County, Razavi Khorasan province, Iran.

== Demographics ==
=== Population ===
At the time of the 2006 National Census, the village's population was 887 in 207 households. The following census in 2011 counted 1,003 people in 257 households. The 2016 census measured the population of the village as 1,122 people in 285 households.
