= Kal-e Shur Jadid =

Village in Razavi Khorasan province, Iran

Kal-e Shur Jadid Persian: كال شور جديد
- Village
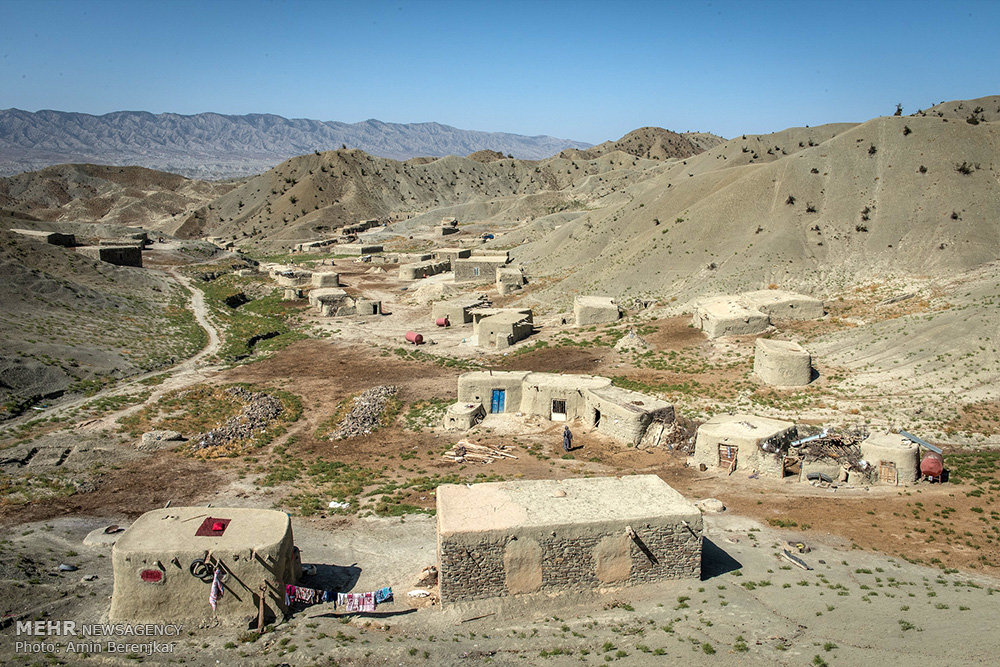
- The village of Kal-e Shur Jadid

- Location within Iran
- Coordinates: 34°01′15″N 59°47′49″E
- Country: Iran
- Province: Razavi Khorasan
- County: Khaf
- District: Jolgeh Zuzan
- Rural District: Keybar

Population (2016)
  - Total: 1,206
- Time zone: UTC+3:30 (IRST)

Kal-e Shur Jadid (Persian: كالشورجديد) (Note: Also romanized as Kāl-e Shūr Jadīd; also known as Kāl-e Shūr) is a village in Keybar Rural District of Jolgeh Zuzan District in Khaf County, Razavi Khorasan province, Iran.

== Demographics ==
=== Population ===
At the time of the 2006 National Census, the village's population was 1,056 in 196 households. The following census in 2011 counted 1,011 people in 231 households. The 2016 census measured the population of the village as 1,206 people in 259 households, the most populous in its rural district.
