= Kalateh-ye Lakhi Jadid =

Village in Razavi Khorasan province, Iran

Kalateh-ye Lakhi Jadid Persian: كلاته لاخي جديد
- Village
- Location within Iran
- Coordinates: 34°06′28″N 59°36′09″E
- Country: Iran
- Province: Razavi Khorasan
- County: Khaf
- District: Jolgeh Zuzan
- Rural District: Keybar

Population (2016)
  - Total: 325
- Time zone: UTC+3:30 (IRST)

Kalateh-ye Lakhi Jadid (Persian: كلاته لاخي جديد) (Note: Also romanized as Kalāteh-ye Lākhī Jadīd; also known as Kalāteh-ye Lākhī) is a village in Keybar Rural District of Jolgeh Zuzan District in Khaf County, Razavi Khorasan province, Iran.

== Demographics ==
=== Population ===
At the time of the 2006 National Census, the village's population was 275 in 61 households. The following census in 2011 counted 274 people in 69 households. The 2016 census measured the population of the village as 325 people in 99 households.
