= Behdadin =

Village in Razavi Khorasan province, Iran

Behdadin Persian: بهدادين
- Village
- Location within Iran
- Coordinates: 34°12′03″N 60°11′12″E
- Country: Iran
- Province: Razavi Khorasan
- County: Khaf
- District: Sangan
- Rural District: Bostan

Population (2016)
  - Total: 2,470
- Time zone: UTC+3:30 (IRST)

Behdadin (Persian: بهدادين) (Note: Also romanized as Behdādīn; also known as Behdāden) is a village in Bostan Rural District of Sangan District in Khaf County, Razavi Khorasan province, Iran.

== Demographics ==
=== Population ===
At the time of the 2006 National Census, the village's population was 1,813 in 346 households. The following census in 2011 counted 2,148 people in 503 households. The 2016 census measured the population of the village as 2,470 people in 630 households, the most populous in its rural district.
