= Barabad =

Barabad or Borabad or Bor Abad (Persian: براباد) may refer to:

- Barabad, Khvaf
- Barabad, Sabzevar
