= Barabad, Khaf =

Village in Razavi Khorasan province, Iran

Barabad Persian: براباد
- Village
- Location within Iran
- Coordinates: 34°25′21″N 60°14′11″E
- Country: Iran
- Province: Razavi Khorasan
- County: Khaf
- District: Sangan
- Rural District: Pain Khaf

Population (2016)
  - Total: 4,452
- Time zone: UTC+3:30 (IRST)

Barabad (Persian: برآباد) (Note: Also romanized as Barābād and Borābād) is a village in Pain Khaf Rural District of Sangan District in Khaf County, Razavi Khorasan province, Iran.

== Demographics ==
=== Population ===
At the time of the 2006 National Census, the village's population was 3,501 in 782 households. The following census in 2011 counted 4,097 people in 1,005 households. The 2016 census measured the population of the village as 4,452 people in 1,154 households, the most populous in its rural district.
