= Battle of Kafer Qal'eh =

Series of 1729 battles

- Part of Nader's Campaigns
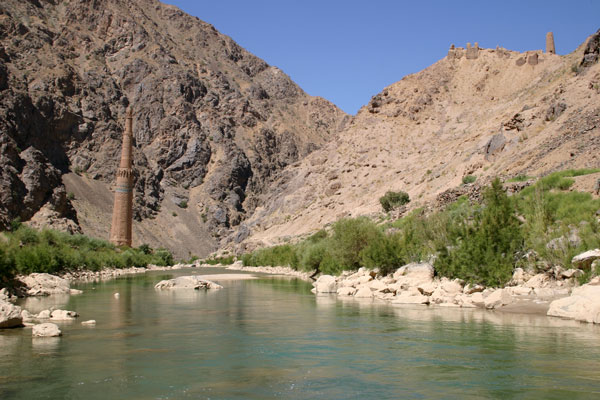
- Harirud, the river near the battlefield
| Date | May 4, – July 1, 1729 |
| Location | Khorasan, Afghanistan |
| Result | Safavid victory |

Belligerents
| Safavid loyalists | Abdali Afghans |

Commanders and leaders
| Nader (WIA) | Allahyar Khan |

Strength
| 15,000 | 30,000 |

Casualties and losses
| Moderate | Moderate |

The Battle of Kafer Qal'eh (Persian: نبرد کافر قلعه) was a series of clashes which decided the outcome to the Herat Campaign. In its culminating stage the battle bears some resemblances to the battle of Sangan although it was both preceded and succeeded by numerous other minor skirmishes and engagements.

== Background ==
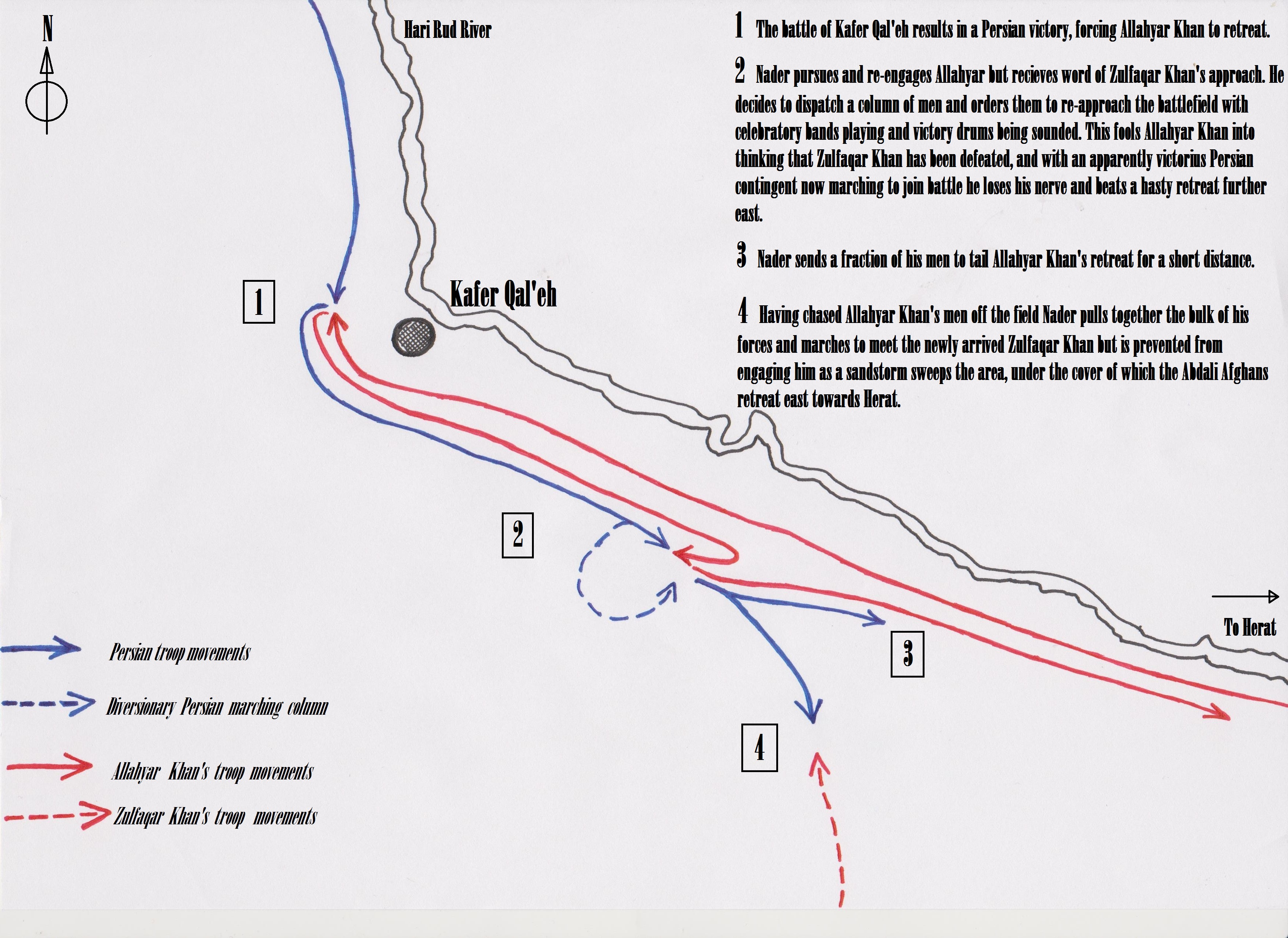
A military diagram demonstrating the key manoeuvres in the campaign

A previous incursion by Nader had resulted in the sacking of Sangan and a tactical victory against an Abdali army sent against him though he did not move to annex any new territory after his minor triumph and left for Mashad. his plans were disrupted when his Shah, Tahmasp II declared he was a traitor and forced him into a brief conflict which Nader won, establishing his authority over the prince. Having subdued all domestic challenges to himself Nader set out for his long overdue expedition against the Herat.

== Battle ==
Heading out to meet Nader's invasion, Allahyar Khan came into contact with Nader 80 kilometres west of Herat at Kfer Qal'eh to find The Persian musketeers drawn up in line and flanked on either side by batteries of field artillery and the cavalry kept separate in reserve. Sending forward small detachments of cavalry to elicit a rash response by Allahyar Khan, Nader hoped to guide him under the combined fire of his line infantry and artillery.

The Abdalis decided to oblige and broke out into a furious charge upon the Persian left flank which began to buckle under pressure, only saved, as in Sangan, by an equally zealous charge by the Persian reserve cavalry led by Nader who personally slew the Abdali commander leading the charge but himself sustained an injury to his leg. Although this counterattack did not rout the Abdali forces outright, it necessitated their withdrawal. The ferocity of the battle was such that both armies withdrew but by the light of dawn the next day it became apparent that Allahyar Khan was in a retreat eastwards.

== See also ==
- Kandahar
- Afsharid dynasty
- Hotaki dynasty
- Durrani dynasty
- Lurs

== Sources ==
- Michael Axworthy, The Sword of Persia: Nader Shah, from Tribal Warrior to Conquering Tyrant Hardcover 348 pages (26 July 2006) Publisher: I.B. Tauris Language: English ISBN 1-85043-706-8
- Mehman Süleymanov Nadir Şah I, S.147-152
- Alamareyi-Naderi
