= Nahur, Iran =

Village in Razavi Khorasan province, Iran

Nahur Persian: نهور
- Village
- Location within Iran
- Coordinates: 33°55′55″N 60°10′42″E
- Country: Iran
- Province: Razavi Khorasan
- County: Khaf
- District: Sangan
- Rural District: Bostan

Population (2016)
  - Total: 203
- Time zone: UTC+3:30 (IRST)

Nahur (Persian: نهور) (Note: Also romanized as Nahūr) is a village in Bostan Rural District of Sangan District in Khaf County, Razavi Khorasan province, Iran.

== Demographics ==
=== Population ===
At the time of the 2006 National Census, the village's population was 197 in 48 households. The following census in 2011 counted 194 people in 50 households. The 2016 census measured the population of the village as 203 people in 55 households.
