= Salami Rural District =

Salami Rural District (Persian: دهستان سالمي) may refer to:

- Salami Rural District (Khuzestan Province)
- Salami Rural District (Razavi Khorasan Province)
