= Shahrak, Khaf =

Village in Razavi Khorasan province, Iran

Shahrak Persian: شهرك
- Village
- Location within Iran
- Coordinates: 34°54′44″N 59°54′17″E
- Country: Iran
- Province: Razavi Khorasan
- County: Khaf
- District: Salami
- Rural District: Bala Khaf

Population (2016)
  - Total: 980
- Time zone: UTC+3:30 (IRST)

Shahrak (Persian: شهرك) is a village in Bala Khaf Rural District of Salami District in Khaf County, Razavi Khorasan province, Iran.

== Demographics ==
=== Population ===
At the time of the 2006 National Census, the village's population was 779 in 172 households. The following census in 2011 counted 935 people in 245 households. The 2016 census measured the population of the village as 980 people in 271 households.
