= Qatar Gaz, Razavi Khorasan =

Village in Razavi Khorasan province, Iran

Qatar Gaz Persian: قطارگز
- Village
- Location within Iran
- Coordinates: 34°20′10″N 59°30′22″E
- Country: Iran
- Province: Razavi Khorasan
- County: Khaf
- District: Jolgeh Zuzan
- Rural District: Keybar

Population (2016)
  - Total: 459
- Time zone: UTC+3:30 (IRST)

Qatar Gaz (Persian: قطارگز) (Note: Also romanized as Qaţār Gaz) is a village in Keybar Rural District of Jolgeh Zuzan District in Khaf County, Razavi Khorasan province, Iran.

== Demographics ==
=== Population ===
At the time of the 2006 National Census, the village's population was 431 in 101 households. The following census in 2011 counted 428 people in 113 households. The 2016 census measured the population of the village as 459 people in 133 households.
