= Qasemabad, Khaf =

City in Razavi Khorasan province, Iran

Qasemabad Persian: قاسم آباد
- City
- Location within Iran
- Coordinates: 34°21′30″N 59°51′42″E
- Country: Iran
- Province: Razavi Khorasan
- County: Khaf
- District: Jolgeh Zuzan
- Established as a city: 2000

Population (2016)
  - Total: 5,145
- Time zone: UTC+3:30 (IRST)

Qasemabad (Persian: قاسم آباد) (Note: Also romanized as Qāsemābād) is a city in, and the capital of, Jolgeh Zuzan District in Khaf County, Razavi Khorasan province, Iran. As a village, it was the capital of Zuzan Rural District (Note: Formerly Jolgeh Zuzan Rural District) until its capital was transferred to the village of Zuzan. The village of Qasemabad was converted to a city in 2000.

== Demographics ==
=== Population ===
At the time of the 2006 National Census, the city's population was 4,022 in 850 households. The following census in 2011 counted 4,414 people in 1,025 households. The 2016 census measured the population of the city as 5,145 people in 1,390 households.
