= Pain Khaf Rural District =

Rural district in Razavi Khorasan province, Iran

Pain Khaf Rural District Persian: دهستان پائين خواف
- Rural District
- Location within Iran
- Coordinates: 34°26′N 60°33′E
- Country: Iran
- Province: Razavi Khorasan
- County: Khaf
- District: Sangan
- Established: 1987
- Capital: Sangan

Population (2016)
  - Total: 4,777
- Time zone: UTC+3:30 (IRST)

Pain Khaf Rural District (Persian: دهستان پائين خواف) is in Sangan District of Khaf County, Razavi Khorasan province, Iran. It is administered from the city of Sangan.

== Demographics ==
=== Population ===
At the time of the 2006 National Census, the rural district's population was 3,692 in 830 households. There were 4,448 inhabitants in 1,081 households at the following census of 2011. The 2016 census measured the population of the rural district as 4,777 in 1,221 households. The most populous of its 15 villages was Barabad, with 4,452 people.

=== Other villages in the rural district ===
- Dardavey
- Garyab
