= Zuzan =

Village in Razavi Khorasan province, Iran

Zuzan Persian: زوزن
- Village
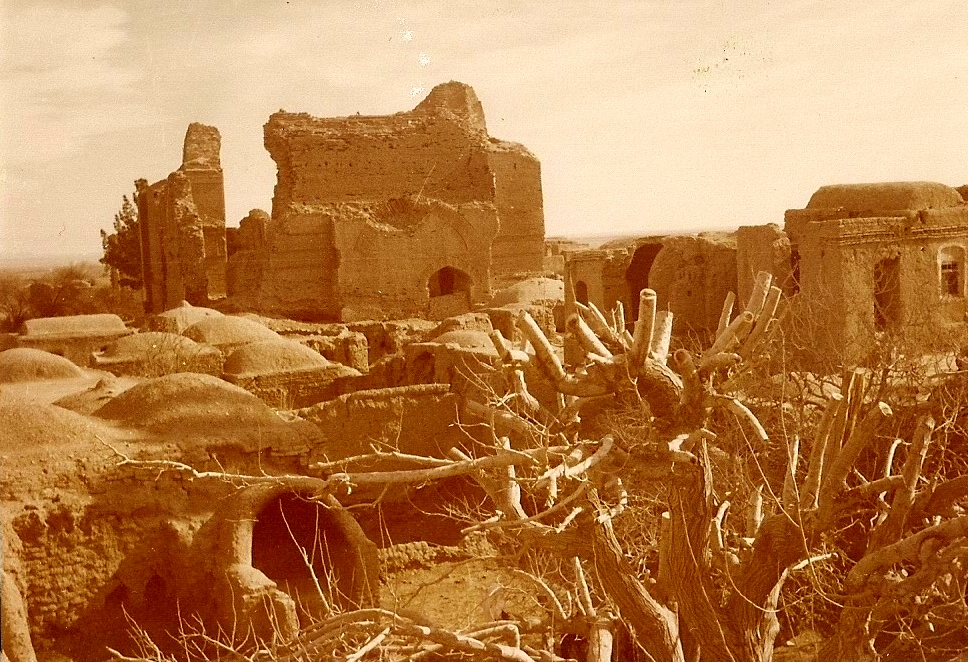
- Historical village of Zuzan and Zuzan Mosque (1980)

- Location within Iran
- Coordinates: 34°20′48″N 59°52′13″E
- Country: Iran
- Province: Razavi Khorasan
- County: Khaf
- District: Jolgeh Zuzan
- Rural District: Zuzan

Population (2016)
  - Total: 2,677
- Time zone: UTC+3:30 (IRST)

Zuzan (Persian: زوزن) (Note: Also romanized as Zūzan; also known as Rūzān and Zozan) is a village in, and the capital of, Zuzan Rural District (Note: Formerly Jolgeh Zuzan Rural District) in Jolgeh Zuzan District of Khaf County, Razavi Khorasan province, Iran. The previous capital of the rural district was the village of Qasemabad, now a city.

== History ==
The earliest artifacts of Zuzan date back to the 4th century. Zuzan was the site of a medieval city, flourishing most notably during the reign of the Khwarazmian Empire. Zuzan was at a distance of other major medieval metropolises such as Khargerd, Nishapur, Herat, Jam, and Merv.

The city was rectangularly planned and contained irrigation systems and dams. Most of the historical remnants of the city have been lost to time, but two major historical monuments remain, the Zuzan Madrasa and the Malek Zuzan Mosque.

The historical city is on the Iranian tentative list for UNESCO World Heritage nomination.

=== Zuzan Madrasa ===
Although only parts of the inscription containing the date of the monument remain, this monument can be dated to 1219. Andre Godard, a French archaeologist first described the building and attributed it to the Khwarazmian Empire in 1949. Godard initially misidentified the building as a mosque but an inscription dedicated to Abu Hanifa shows that the building was actually an Hanafite madrasa.

Architecturally, the madrasa is influenced by Ghurid and Khwarazmian architecture. The building used a typical four-iwan plan type of the region, although only two iwans now remain. The building contains sophisticated ceramics and highly stylized inscriptions.

== Demographics ==
=== Population ===
At the time of the 2006 National Census, the village's population was 2,183 in 479 households. The following census in 2011 counted 2,585 people in 626 households. The 2016 census measured the population of the village as 2,677 people in 744 households, the most populous in its rural district.

== Notable people ==
- Hamza ibn Ali ibn Ahmad, founding leader of the Druze.
- Abu Sahl Zawzani, Persian statesman who served as the chief secretary of the Ghaznavids briefly in 1040, and later from 1041 to an unknown date was from Zuzan.
- Qiwam al-Din Muayyid al-Mulk Abu Bakr ibn Ali al-Zuzani, the governor of the area from the 1200 to 1220, who constructed the most notable sites in the village; the Madrasa and Mosque of Malek Zuzan.

== Sources ==
- Bosworth, C. Edmund (2001). "GHAZNAVIDS". Encyclopaedia Iranica. Vol. X, Fasc. 6. pp. 578–583.
- Hendrix, Scott; Okeja, Uchenna, eds. (2018). The World's Greatest Religious Leaders: How Religious Figures Helped Shape World History [2 volumes]. ABC-CLIO. p. 11. ISBN 978-144084138-5.
- "Zuzan". UNESCO World Heritage Centre. 9 August 2007.
- Blair, Sheila (1985). "The Madrasa at Zuzan: Islamic Architecture in Eastern Iran on the Eve of the Mongol Invasions". Muqarnas: An Annual on Islamic Art and Architecture (3).
