= Niazabad, Khaf =

Village in Razavi Khorasan province, Iran

Niazabad Persian: نيازاباد
- Village
- Location within Iran
- Coordinates: 34°13′51″N 60°14′40″E
- Country: Iran
- Province: Razavi Khorasan
- County: Khaf
- District: Sangan
- Rural District: Bostan

Population (2016)
  - Total: 857
- Time zone: UTC+3:30 (IRST)

Niazabad (Persian: نيازاباد) (Note: Also romanized as Neyāzābād, Nīāzābād, and Nīyāz Ābād) is a village in, and the capital of, Bostan Rural District in Sangan District of Khaf County, Razavi Khorasan province, Iran.

== Demographics ==
=== Population ===
At the time of the 2006 National Census, the village's population was 836 in 189 households. The following census in 2011 counted 766 people in 223 households. The 2016 census measured the population of the village as 857 people in 250 households.
