= Bala Khaf Rural District =

Rural district in Razavi Khorasan province, Iran

Bala Khaf Rural District Persian: دهستان بالا خواف
- Rural District
- Location within Iran
- Coordinates: 34°51′N 60°00′E
- Country: Iran
- Province: Razavi Khorasan
- County: Khaf
- District: Salami
- Established: 1987
- Capital: Chamanabad

Population (2016)
  - Total: 20,394
- Time zone: UTC+3:30 (IRST)

Bala Khaf Rural District (Persian: دهستان بالا خواف) is in Salami District of Khaf County, Razavi Khorasan province, Iran. Its capital is the village of Chamanabad.

== Demographics ==
=== Population ===
At the time of the 2006 National Census, the rural district's population was 16,278 in 3,619 households. There were 18,842 inhabitants in 4,796 households at the following census of 2011. The 2016 census measured the population of the rural district as 20,394 in 5,494 households. The most populous of its 36 villages was Sedeh (now a city), with 4,258 people.

=== Other villages in the rural district ===
- Abbasabad
- Aliabad-e Jadid
- Fadak
- Farahabad
- Hajjiabad
- Hezarkhusheh
- Khalilabad
- Kheyrabad
- Miyanrudi
- Nasrabad
- Salman
- Seyyedabad
- Shahrak
- Sijavand
- Valiabad
