= Zuzan Rural District =

Rural district in Razavi Khorasan province, Iran

Zuzan Rural District Persian: دهستان زوزن
- Rural District
- Location within Iran
- Coordinates: 34°34′N 59°46′E
- Country: Iran
- Province: Razavi Khorasan
- County: Khaf
- District: Jolgeh Zuzan
- Established: 1987
- Capital: Zuzan

Population (2016)
  - Total: 7,002
- Time zone: UTC+3:30 (IRST)

Zuzan Rural District (Persian: دهستان زوزن) (Note: Formerly Jolgeh Zuzan Rural District (دهستان جلگه زوزن)) is in Jolgeh Zuzan District of Khaf County, Razavi Khorasan province, Iran. Its capital is the village of Zuzan. The previous capital of the rural district was the village of Qasemabad, now a city.

== Demographics ==
=== Population ===
At the time of the 2006 National Census, the rural district's population was 5,972 in 1,264 households. There were 6,561 inhabitants in 1,643 households at the following census of 2011. The 2016 census measured the population of the rural district as 7,002 in 1,882 households. The most populous of its 25 villages was Zuzan, with 2,677 people.

=== Other villages in the rural district ===
- Asadabad, Khaf
- Bagh-e Bakhshi
- Biasabad-e Now Sazi
- Mahabad-e Jadid
