= Sedeh, Razavi Khorasan =

City in Razavi Khorasan province, Iran

Sedeh Persian: سده
- City
- Location within Iran
- Coordinates: 34°49′45″N 59°53′25″E
- Country: Iran
- Province: Razavi Khorasan
- County: Khaf
- District: Salami
- Established as a city: 2021

Population (2016)
  - Total: 4,258
- Time zone: UTC+3:30 (IRST)

Sedeh (Persian: سده) (Note: Also known as Sehdeh) is a city in Salami District of Khaf County, Razavi Khorasan province, Iran.

== Demographics ==
=== Population ===
At the time of the 2006 National Census, Sedeh's population was 3,449 in 745 households, when it was a village in Bala Khaf Rural District. The following census in 2011 counted 3,916 people in 1,014 households. The 2016 census measured the population of the village as 4,258 people in 1,169 households, the most populous in its rural district.

Sedeh was converted to a city in 2021.
