= Bostan Rural District (Khaf County) =

Rural district in Razavi Khorasan province, Iran

Bostan Rural District Persian: دهستان بستان
- Rural District
- Location within Iran
- Coordinates: 34°06′20″N 60°13′55″E
- Country: Iran
- Province: Razavi Khorasan
- County: Khaf
- District: Sangan
- Established: 1993
- Capital: Niazabad

Population (2016)
  - Total: 9,344
- Time zone: UTC+3:30 (IRST)

Bostan Rural District (Persian: دهستان بستان) is in Sangan District of Khaf County, Razavi Khorasan province, Iran. Its capital is the village of Niazabad.

== Demographics ==
=== Population ===
At the time of the 2006 National Census, the rural district's population was 7,316 in 1,509 households. There were 8,248 inhabitants in 1,936 households at the following census of 2011. The 2016 census measured the population of the rural district as 9,344 in 2,326 households. The most populous of its nine villages was Behdadin, with 2,470 people.

=== Other villages in the rural district ===
- Boqsani
- Chah-e Zul
- Hoseynabad
- Karyun
- Mazhnabad
- Mohammadabad
- Nahur
