= Salami, Iran =

City in Razavi Khorasan province, Iran

Salami Persian: سلامی
- City
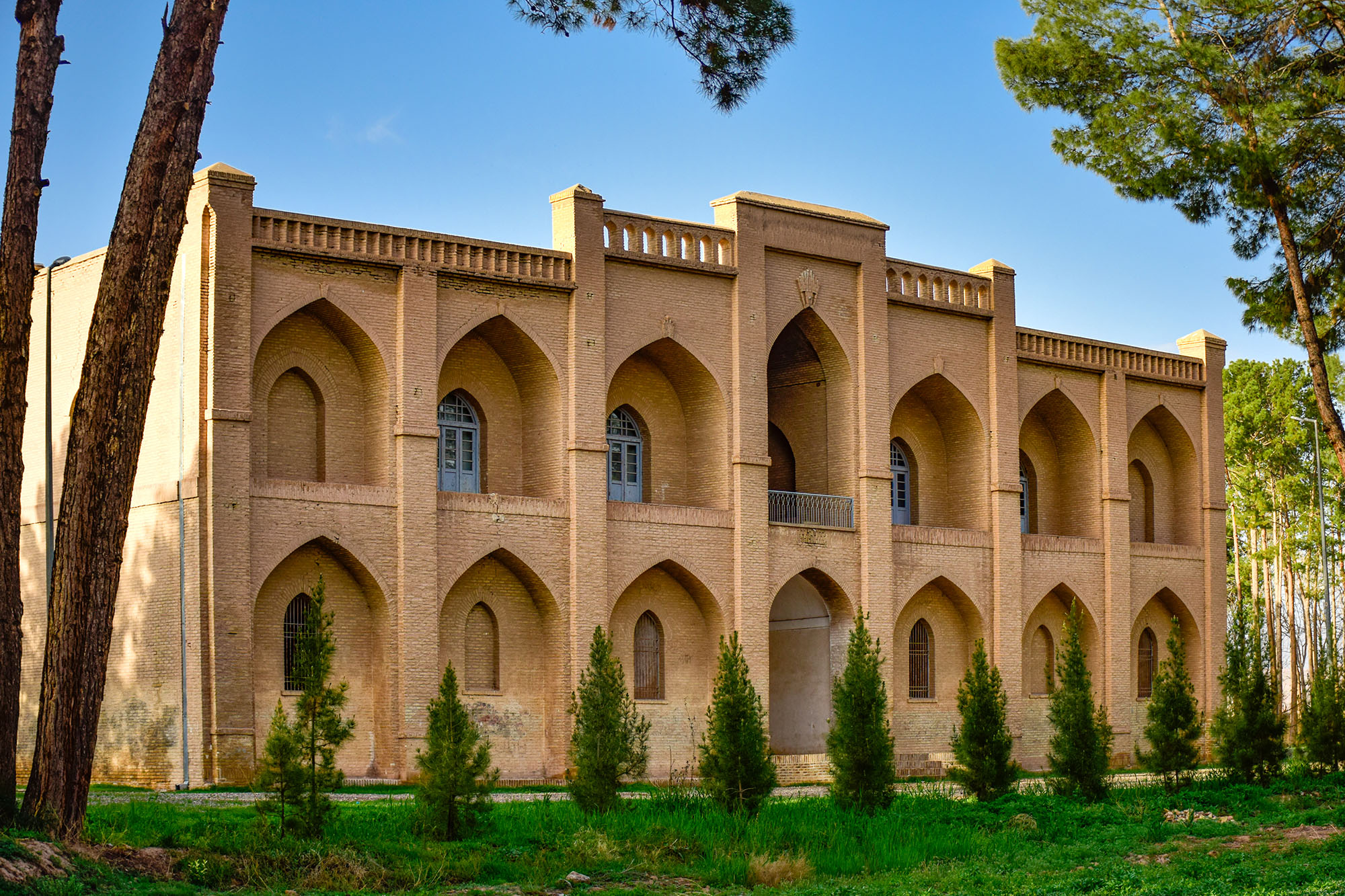
- Salami Palace

- Location within Iran
- Coordinates: 34°44′39″N 59°58′40″E
- Country: Iran
- Province: Razavi Khorasan
- County: Khaf
- District: Salami
- Established as a city: 2004

Population (2016)
  - Total: 7,555
- Time zone: UTC+3:30 (IRST)

Salami (Persian: سلامی) (Note: Also romanized as Salāmey, Salamī, and Salāmī; also known as Salmān) is a city in, and the capital of, Salami District in Khaf County, Razavi Khorasan province, Iran. It also serves as the administrative center for Salami Rural District. The village of Salami was converted to a city in 2004. It is one of the larger cities of the county, at a distance of 90km from Torbat-e Heydarieh and 25km from Khaf.

== Demographics ==
=== Population ===
At the time of the 2006 National Census, the city's population was 6,056 in 1,341 households. The following census in 2011 counted 6,581 people in 1,607 households. The 2016 census measured the population of the city as 7,555 people in 1,951 households.
