= Khorasan campaign of Nader Shah =

Military campaign in Persia (1726–1727)

Nader's Conquest of Khorasan
- Part of Nader's Campaigns
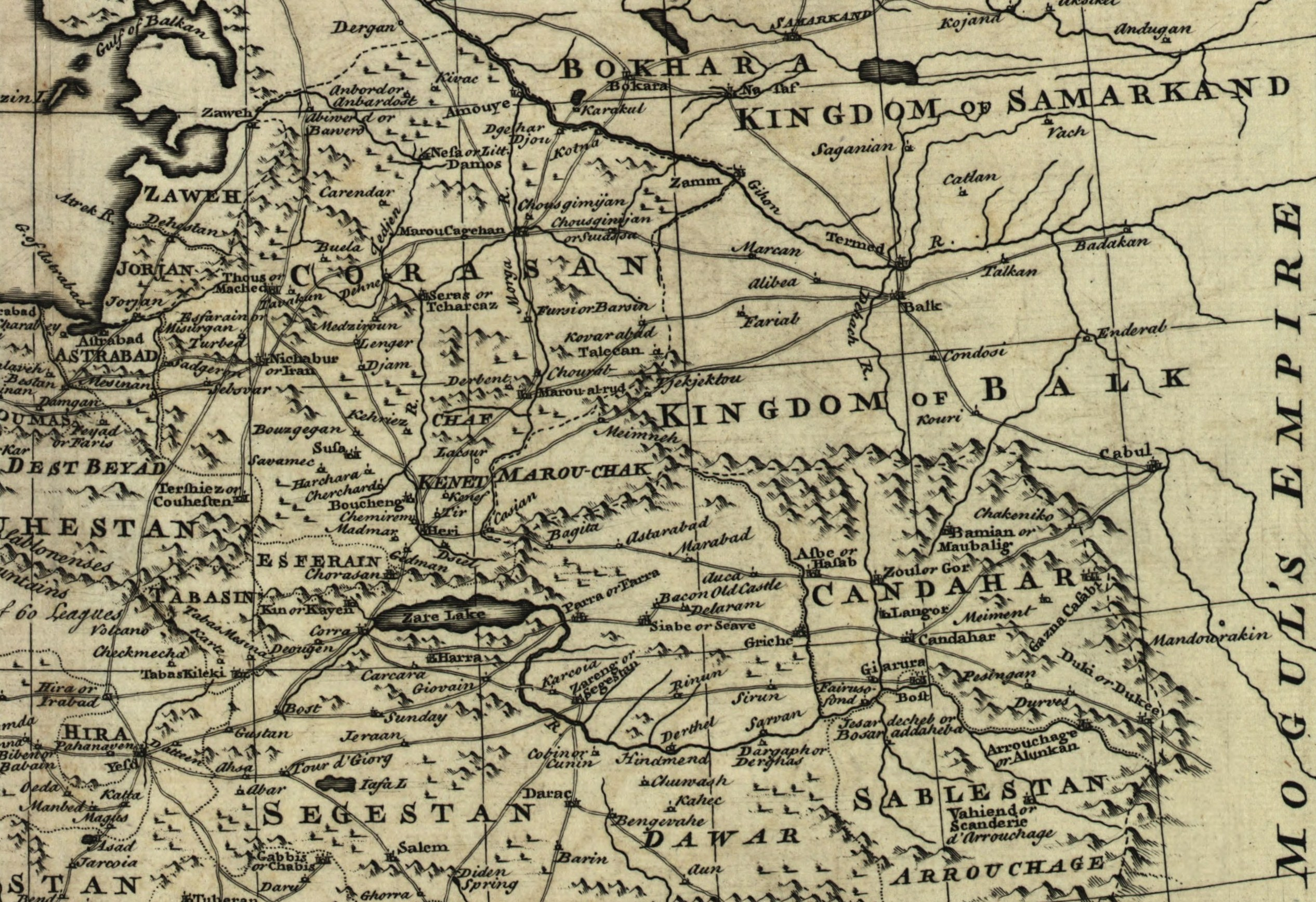
- An accurate map of Persia by Emanuel Bowen showing the names of territories during the Persian Safavid dynasty and Mughal Empire of India (c. 1500–1747)
| Date | 1726–1727 |
| Location | Khorasan |
| Result | Safavid victory |
| Territorial changes | The capital of Khorasan, Mashhad, comes under loyalist control |

Belligerents
| Safavid loyalists | Separatists in Khorasan; Abdali Afghans |

Commanders and leaders
| Tahmasp II (nominal); Nader; Fathali Khan Qajar (executed) | Malek Mahmoud Sistani; Pir Mohammad |

Strength
| 30,000 | Unknown |

Casualties and losses
| Negligible | Minimal |

The Khorasan campaign of Nader Shah (Persian: لشکرکشی نادرشاه به خراسان) by Safavid loyalist forces against separatists in Khorasan was Nader Shah's first major military campaign which he waged on behalf of the new Safavid pretender to the throne, Tahmasp II. It would propel him into the centre of the political landscape of war-torn early eighteenth-century Persia.

== Rebellion and separation ==
Revolts swept through the province during the 1720s as a direct consequence of the Afghan revolt in the eastern provinces of the empire which eventually led to an invasion led by the Hotaki leader Mahmud Hotaki. In a pitched battle Mahmud inflicted a humiliating defeat on the Imperial forces sent from Isfehan in the battle of Gulnabad, after which he marched on the capital itself where he captured Isfehan after a terrible siege.

A courtier in Isfahan by the name of Malek Mahmoud Sistani reached an accord with the Hotaki Afghan conquerors in which he would set up an independent kingdom in khorasan in exchange for his recognition of Mahmud as Shah of Persia. Sistani entered Khorasan and managed to regain most of Khorasan from the rebels and local warlords in a relatively short period of time with the capital Mashad falling into his hands. At this juncture Nader had established himself in the fortress of kalat north of Mashad and with a mere force of 1,200 men raided Sistani's territory, although they did not come into direct confrontation Nader had established himself as the only real challenge to Sistani's influence in Khorasan.

== Tahmasp II and the siege of Mashad ==
After the conclusion of the Siege of Isfahan, Mamud sent a contingent of his Afghans to subdue Qazvin where a new Safavid pretender Tahmasp had risen and proclaimed himself Shah. He was forced to flee Qazvin but could not stay in the region permanently as those areas not under Afghan control were unremittingly coming under the marching boots of Ottoman soldiers invading from the west. Tahmasp was chased from the west of the country and in Astarabad found a loyal if difficult subject warlord by the name of Fathali Khan of the Qajar clan.

Deciding that it was too soon to march on Isfahan to liberate the heartland of Persia they would begin in Khorasan where they could forge alliances and rally more troops under their banner. Marching toward Khorasan they came into contact with Nader whose loyalty they acquired along with his now much enlarged fighting force (Nader had campaigned against the Kurds and successfully incorporated many of them into his small army). A combined force of 30,000 men lay siege to Mashad with Sistani and his commander-in-chief Pir Mohammad trapped within the city's walls. Tahmasp had developed a tense relationship with Fathali Khan and matters came to a head on October 10, 1726, when Nader brought Tahmasp an intercepted letter, the damning contents of which provided abundant evidence of a clandestine line of communication between Fathali and Sistani. Nader, fearful that the Qajar contingent may leave if any harm befell their leader, advised Tahmasp to spare his life for the time being. Tahmasp, though agreeing with Nader's judgement, nevertheless had Fathali executed the subsequent day.

The Qajar contingent however remained with the Loyalist army despite Fathali's beheading and ironically it was a betrayal on the other side of the conflict that brought the siege to an end where Pir Mohammad allowed Nader to infiltrate the city walls forcing Sistani to take refuge in the citadel, surrendering shortly after.

== Aftermath of the siege ==
The defeated Malek Mahmoud Sistani was surprisingly treated with courtesy and in a show of reconciliatory mercy allowed to spend the rest of his life as a sage (Though he was executed the following year when he became suspect in Nader's eyes). The results of the siege had gifted the capital of Khorasan to Tahmasp as well as gifting Fathali's position to the sole person of Nader as he now took to subdue the remaining Khans and tribes of the province hence further augmenting his forces. His conquest of Khorasan allowed the Safavid loyalist movement to next focus on an expedition further east towards Herat.

== Battle of Sangan ==
in 1727 Nader Shah besieged Sangan and successfully conquered the city However, an Abdali army numbering 7-8,000 men marched towards Sangan to relieve the fortress. When Nader heard of this, he sent a force to the village of Niazabad to face the Afghans. The battle lasted four days. Most of Nader's men were in trenches of 500 of his best cavalry would maneuver and fight off the Abdali troops. After the end of the 4 days the Abdali forces withdrew to Herat. However, Nader declined to pursue the Abdalis due to his insecure position, instead withdrawing with his army back to Mashhad.

== See also ==
- Military of Afsharid Iran
- Kandahar
- Afsharid Iran
- Hotaki dynasty
- Durrani dynasty
- Lurs

== Sources ==
- Michael Axworthy, The Sword of Persia: Nader Shah, from Tribal Warrior to Conquering Tyrant Hardcover 348 pages (26 July 2006) Publisher: I.B. Tauris Language: English ISBN 1-85043-706-8
- Nejatie, Sajjad (2017) The Pearl of Pearls: The Abdālī-Durrānī Confederacy and Its Transformation under Aḥmad Shāh, Durr-i Durrān pg.262
- Lockhart, Lawrence (2011), Nadir Shah: A Critical Study Based Mainly Upon Contemporary Sources pp. 28–29.
