= Shahruk =

Shahruk شهروك
- Village
- Location within Iran
- Coordinates: 27°55′12″N 60°44′23″E
- Country: Iran
- Province: Sistan and Baluchestan
- County: Khash
- Bakhsh: Central
- Rural District: Karvandar

Population (2006)
  - Total: 130
- Time zone: UTC+3:30 (IRST)
  - Summer (DST): UTC+4:30 (IRDT)

Shahruk (Persian: شهروك, also Romanized as Shahrūk; also known as Shahrak) is a village in Karvandar Rural District, in the Central District of Khash County, Sistan and Baluchestan Province, Iran. At the 2006 census, its population was 130, in 26 families.
