= Shahrak, Irandegan =

Shahrak شهرك
- Village
- Location within Iran
- Coordinates: 27°34′24″N 60°59′38″E
- Country: Iran
- Province: Sistan and Baluchestan
- County: Khash
- Bakhsh: Irandegan
- Rural District: Irandegan

Population (2006)
  - Total: 75
- Time zone: UTC+3:30 (IRST)
  - Summer (DST): UTC+4:30 (IRDT)

Shahrak (Persian: شهرك; also known as Shahrak-e Genz) is a village in Irandegan Rural District, Irandegan District, Khash County, Sistan and Baluchestan province, Iran. At the 2006 census, its population was 75, in 23 families.
