= Sangan, Razavi Khorasan =

City in Razavi Khorasan province, Iran

Sangan Persian: سنگان
- City
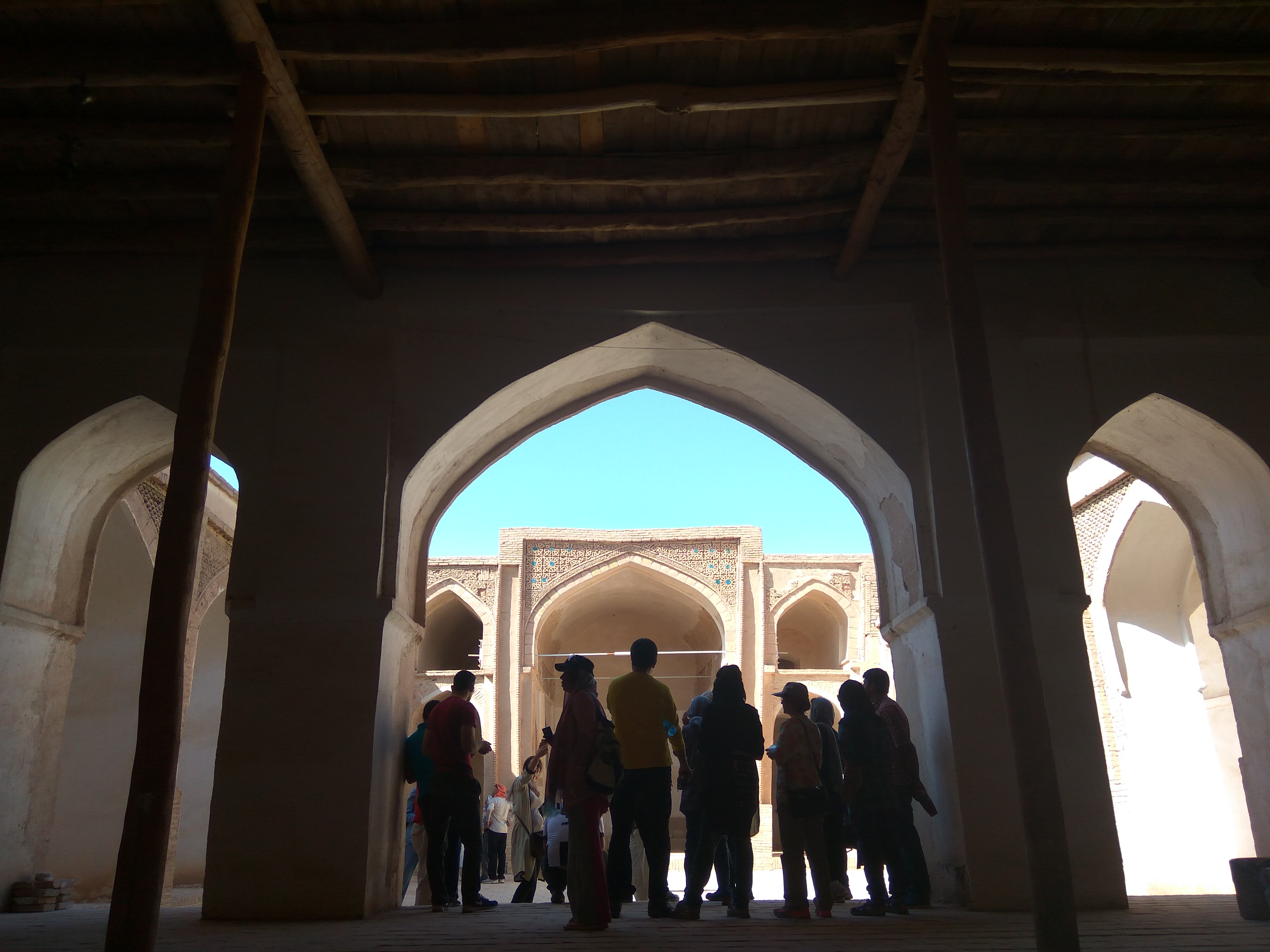
- Sangan, Razavi Khorasan

- Location within Iran
- Coordinates: 34°23′46″N 60°15′26″E
- Country: Iran
- Province: Razavi Khorasan
- County: Khaf
- District: Sangan

Population (2016)
  - Total: 12,443
- Time zone: UTC+3:30 (IRST)

Sangan (Persian: سنگان) (Note: Also romanized as Sangān; also known as Sangān Pā’īn, Sangān-e Pā’īn, Sangūn-e Pā’īn, and Sangūn-i-Pāīn) is a city in, and the capital of, Sangan District in Khaf County, Razavi Khorasan province, Iran. It also serves as the administrative center for Pain Khaf Rural District.

== Demographics ==
=== Population ===
At the time of the 2006 National Census, the city's population was 8,718 in 1,952 households. The following census in 2011 counted 9,500 people in 2,325 households. The 2016 census measured the population of the city as 12,443 people in 3,117 households.

== Geography and climate ==
Sangan is at an elevation of 1146.01 meters (3759.88 feet) above sea level and has a mid-latitude steppe climate. Annually, Sangan typically receives about 44.0 millimeters of precipitation and has 78.16 rainy days.
