= Qatar Gaz, South Khorasan =

Qatar Gaz قطارگز
- Village
- Location within Iran
- Coordinates: 33°11′39″N 59°00′23″E
- Country: Iran
- Province: South Khorasan
- County: Birjand
- Bakhsh: Central
- Rural District: Fasharud

Population (2006)
  - Total: 70
- Time zone: UTC+3:30 (IRST)
  - Summer (DST): UTC+4:30 (IRDT)

Qatar Gaz (Persian: قطارگز, also Romanized as Qaţār Gaz; also known as Rādgaz) is a village in Fasharud Rural District, in the Central District of Birjand County, South Khorasan Province, Iran. At the 2006 census, its population was 70, in 23 families.
