= Shahrak, Kurdistan =

Shahrak شهرك
- Village
- Location within Iran
- Coordinates: 36°24′54″N 47°31′35″E
- Country: Iran
- Province: Kurdistan
- County: Bijar
- Bakhsh: Korani
- Rural District: Korani

Population (2006)
  - Total: 329
- Time zone: UTC+3:30 (IRST)
  - Summer (DST): UTC+4:30 (IRDT)

Shahrak (Persian: شهرك) is a village in Korani Rural District, Korani District, Bijar County, Kurdistan Province, Iran. At the 2006 census, its population was 329, in 88 families. The village is populated by Azerbaijanis.
