= Salami Rural District (Khaf County) =

Rural district in Razavi Khorasan province, Iran

Salami Rural District Persian: دهستان سلامي
- Rural District
- Location within Iran
- Coordinates: 34°45′N 60°01′E
- Country: Iran
- Province: Razavi Khorasan
- County: Khaf
- District: Salami
- Established: 1993
- Capital: Salami

Population (2016)
  - Total: 9,498
- Time zone: UTC+3:30 (IRST)

Salami Rural District (Persian: دهستان سلامي) is in Salami District of Khaf County, Razavi Khorasan province, Iran. It is administered from the city of Salami.

== Demographics ==
=== Population ===
At the time of the 2006 National Census, the rural district's population was 7,324 in 1,469 households. There were 8,444 inhabitants in 1,979 households at the following census of 2011. The 2016 census measured the population of the rural district as 9,498 in 2,374 households. The most populous of its 12 villages was Razdab, with 1,880 people.

=== Other villages in the rural district ===
- Ahmadabad
- Bandivan
- Chahar Deh
- Hasanabad
- Qaleh-ye Now
- Sarab
