= Keybar Rural District =

Rural district in Razavi Khorasan province, Iran

Keybar Rural District Persian: دهستان كيبر
- Rural District
- Location within Iran
- Coordinates: 34°11′N 59°43′E
- Country: Iran
- Province: Razavi Khorasan
- County: Khaf
- District: Jolgeh Zuzan
- Established: 1993
- Capital: Ebrahimi

Population (2016)
  - Total: 9,915
- Time zone: UTC+3:30 (IRST)

Keybar Rural District (Persian: دهستان كيبر) is in Jolgeh Zuzan District of Khaf County, Razavi Khorasan province, Iran. Its capital is the village of Ebrahimi.

== Demographics ==
=== Population ===
At the time of the 2006 National Census, the rural district's population was 8,934 in 1,948 households. There were 8,548 inhabitants in 2,114 households at the following census of 2011. The 2016 census measured the population of the rural district as 9,915 in 2,582 households. The most populous of its 22 villages was Kal-e Shur Jadid, with 1,206 people.

=== Other villages in the rural district ===
- Aliabad
- Arg-e Qalandar
- Barkad Jadid
- Boneyabad
- Chah-e Gachi
- Chah-e Khesht
- Chah-e Masileh
- Chah-e Matar
- Deh-e Khatib Jadid
- Ghazanfari
- Hamzar
- Hasanabad
- Kalateh-ye Lakhi Jadid
- Khaltabad-e Now Sazi
- Mehrabad
- Qatar Gaz
- Shirgerd
