= Qatar Gaz, Kerman =

Qatar Gaz قطارگز
- Village
- Location within Iran
- Coordinates: 28°54′27″N 55°53′05″E
- Country: Iran
- Province: Kerman
- County: Sirjan
- Bakhsh: Central
- Rural District: Golestan

Population (2006)
  - Total: 52
- Time zone: UTC+3:30 (IRST)
  - Summer (DST): UTC+4:30 (IRDT)

Qatar Gaz (Persian: قطارگز, also Romanized as Qaţār Gaz) is a village in Golestan Rural District, in the Central District of Sirjan County, Kerman Province, Iran. At the 2006 census, its population was 52, in 16 families.
