= Sangan District =

District in Razavi Khorasan province, Iran

Sangan District Persian: بخش سنگان
- District
- Location within Iran
- Coordinates: 34°16′N 60°24′E
- Country: Iran
- Province: Razavi Khorasan
- County: Khaf
- Established: 1989
- Capital: Sangan

Population (2016)
  - Total: 26,564
- Time zone: UTC+3:30 (IRST)

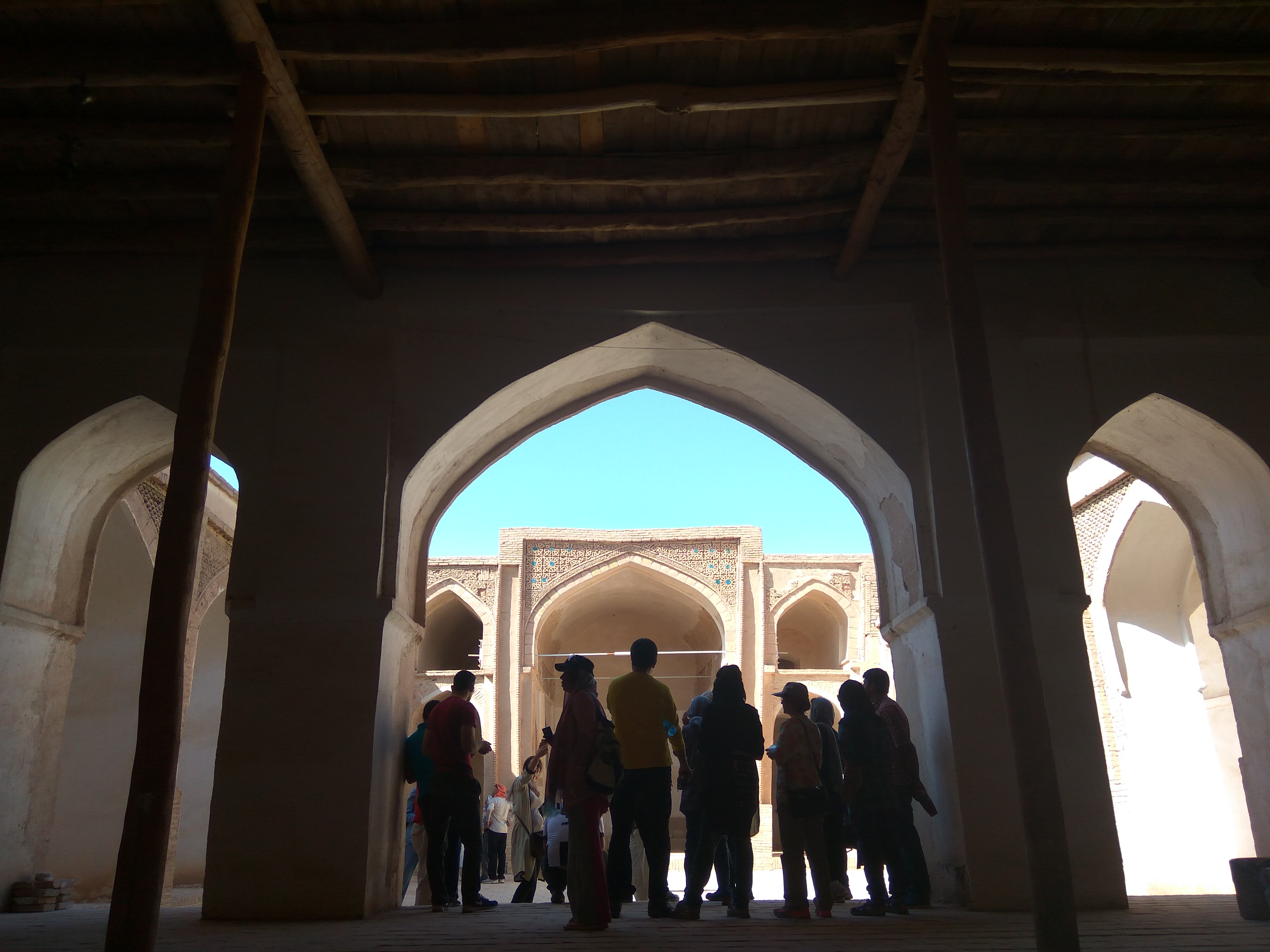
Sangan Mosque

Sangan District (Persian: بخش سنگان) is in Khaf County, Razavi Khorasan province, Iran. Its capital is the city of Sangan.

== Demographics ==
=== Population ===
At the time of the 2006 National Census, the district's population was 19,726 in 4,291 households. The following census in 2011 counted 22,196 people in 5,342 households. The 2016 census measured the population of the district as 26,564 inhabitants in 6,664 households.

=== Administrative divisions ===
Sangan District Population
Administrative Divisions	2006	2011	2016
Bostan RD	7,316	8,248	9,344
Pain Khaf RD	3,692	4,448	4,777
Sangan (city)	8,718	9,500	12,443
Total	19,726	22,196	26,564
RD = Rural District
