= Salami District =

District in Razavi Khorasan province, Iran

Salami District Persian: بخش سلامی
- District
- Location within Iran
- Coordinates: 34°49′N 60°00′E
- Country: Iran
- Province: Razavi Khorasan
- County: Khaf
- Established: 2002
- Capital: Salami

Population (2016)
  - Total: 37,447
- Time zone: UTC+3:30 (IRST)

Salami District (Persian: بخش سلامی) is in Khaf County, Razavi Khorasan province, Iran. Its capital is the city of Salami.

== History ==
The village of Sedeh was converted to a city in 2021.

== Demographics ==
=== Population ===
At the time of the 2006 census, the district's population was 29,658 in 6,429 households. The following census in 2011 counted 33,867 people in 8,382 households. The 2016 census measured the population of the district as 37,447 inhabitants in 9,819 households.

=== Administrative divisions ===
Salami District Population
Administrative Divisions	2006	2011	2016
Bala Khaf RD	16,278	18,842	20,394
Salami RD	7,324	8,444	9,498
Salami (city)	6,056	6,581	7,555
Sedeh (city) (Note: Became a city after the 2016 census)			
Total	29,658	33,867	37,447
RD = Rural District
