= Jolgeh Zuzan District =

District in Razavi Khorasan province, Iran

Jolgeh Zuzan District Persian: بخش جلگه زوزن
- District
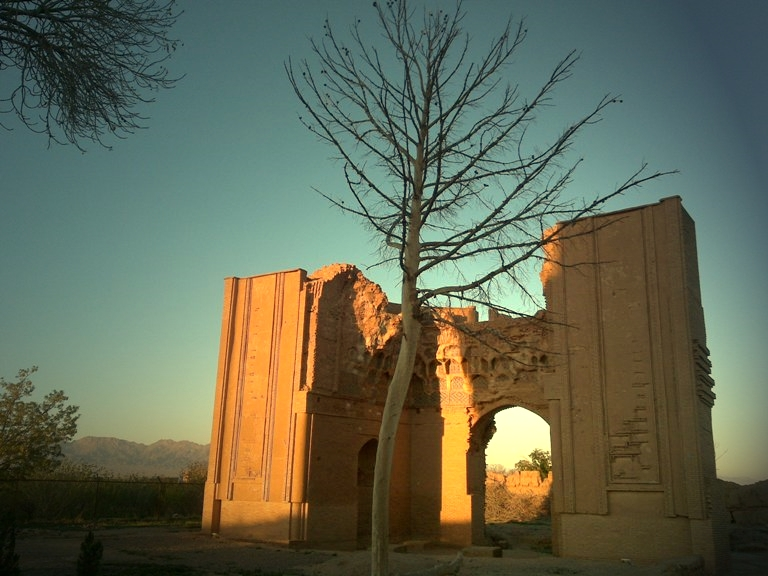
- Zuzan Mosque

- Location within Iran
- Coordinates: 34°23′N 59°44′E
- Country: Iran
- Province: Razavi Khorasan
- County: Khaf
- Established: 1993
- Capital: Qasemabad

Population (2016)
  - Total: 22,062
- Time zone: UTC+3:30 (IRST)

Jolgeh Zuzan District (Persian: بخش جلگه زوزن) is in Khaf County, Razavi Khorasan province, Iran. Its capital is the city of Qasemabad. The district contains the UNESCO world heritage site of Zuzan.

== Demographics ==
=== Population ===
At the time of the 2006 National Census, the district's population was 18,928 in 4,062 households. The following census in 2011 counted 19,523 people in 4,782 households. The 2016 census measured the population of the district as 22,062 inhabitants in 5,854 households.

=== Administrative divisions ===
Jolgeh Zuzan District Population
Administrative Divisions	2006	2011	2016
Keybar RD	8,934	8,548	9,915
Zuzan RD (Note: Formerly Jolgeh Zuzan Rural District)	5,972	6,561	7,002
Qasemabad (city)	4,022	4,414	5,145
Total	18,928	19,523	22,062
RD = Rural District
