= Khaf County =

County in Razavi Khorasan Province, Iran

Khaf County Persian: شهرستان خواف
- County
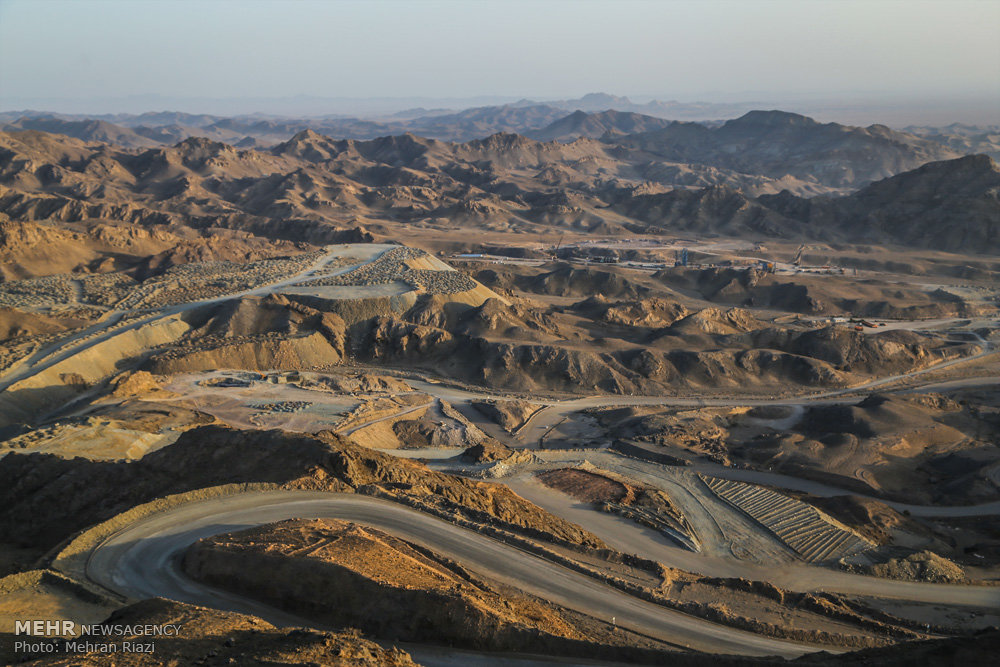
- Iron quarry, Sangan

- Location of Khaf County in Razavi Khorasan province (bottom right, yellow)

- Location of Razavi Khorasan province in Iran
- Coordinates: 34°26′N 60°09′E
- Country: Iran
- Province: Razavi Khorasan
- Established: 1989
- Capital: Khaf
- Districts: Central, Jolgeh Zuzan, Salami, Sangan

Area
  - Total: 9,827 km^{2} (3,794 sq mi)

Population (2016)
  - Total: 138,972
  - Density: 14.14/km^{2} (36.63/sq mi)
- Time zone: UTC+3:30 (IRST)

Khaf County (Persian: شهرستان خواف) (Note: Also romanized as Šahrestâne Xvâf), also as Khwaf, is in Razavi Khorasan province, Iran. Its capital is the city of Khaf.

== History ==
The village of Sedeh was converted to a city in 2021.

== Demographics ==
=== Population ===
At the time of the 2006 National Census, the county's population was 108,964 in 23,896 households. The following census in 2011 counted 121,859 people in 29,923 households. The 2016 census measured the population of the county as 138,972 in 36,399 households.

=== Administrative divisions ===
Khaf County's population history and administrative structure over three consecutive censuses are shown in the following table.

Khaf County Population
Administrative Divisions	2006	2011	2016
Central District	40,652	46,273	52,899
Miyan Khaf RD	11,135	8,537	8,782
Nashtifan RD	1,810	1,866	1,752
Khaf (city)	21,160	28,444	33,189
Nashtifan (city)	6,547	7,426	9,176
Jolgeh Zuzan District	18,928	19,523	22,062
Keybar RD	8,934	8,548	9,915
Zuzan RD (Note: Formerly Jolgeh Zuzan Rural District)	5,972	6,561	7,002
Qasemabad (city)	4,022	4,414	5,145
Salami District	29,658	33,867	37,447
Bala Khaf RD	16,278	18,842	20,394
Salami RD	7,324	8,444	9,498
Salami (city)	6,056	6,581	7,555
Sedeh (city) (Note: Became a city after the 2016 census)			
Sangan District	19,726	22,196	26,564
Bostan RD	7,316	8,248	9,344
Pain Khaf RD	3,692	4,448	4,777
Sangan (city)	8,718	9,500	12,443
Total	108,964	121,859	138,972
RD = Rural District

== Archaeology ==
The historical city of Zuzan is located close to Khaf and has been submitted to World Heritage tentative lists by UNESCO.

== See also ==
Media related to Khaf County at Wikimedia Commons
