= Timurnama =

Work by Hatefi

- by Hatefi
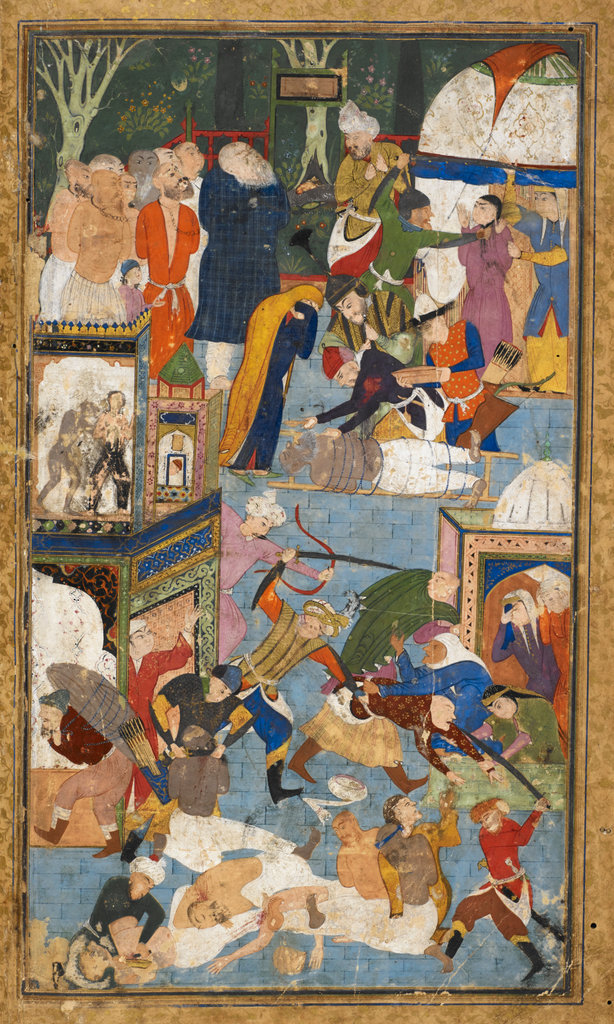
- The 1387 Sacking of Isfahan by Timur. Ms 22703 (folio 2v) in the British Library. Bukhara (mid 16th century).
- Language: Persian
- Subject: Timur
- Form: Part of a Khamsa

The Timurnama (Book of Timur) or Zafarnama (Book of Victory) is a poem by the Persian poet Hatefi about the life of the Turco-Mongol conqueror Timur (1336–1405). It was written between 1492 and 1498 and is often viewed as the most important work by Hatefi.

The Timurnama is the fourth part of Hatefi's Khamsa, a quintet of five long Persian poems, and has been published in India in 1869 and 1958.

== Author ==
The Timurnama was written by the Persian poet Hatefi (c. 1454–1521), a nephew of Jami, who in turn was a prolific scholar and writer of mystical Sufi literature. Hatefi was born in Khar Gerd, which lies in today's Razavi Khorasan province of Iran and during the author's lifetime was part of the declining Timurid Empire (1370–1507) and later Safavid Iran (1501–1736).

Hatefi served at the shrine for the Sufi mystic Qasim Anvar.

== History ==
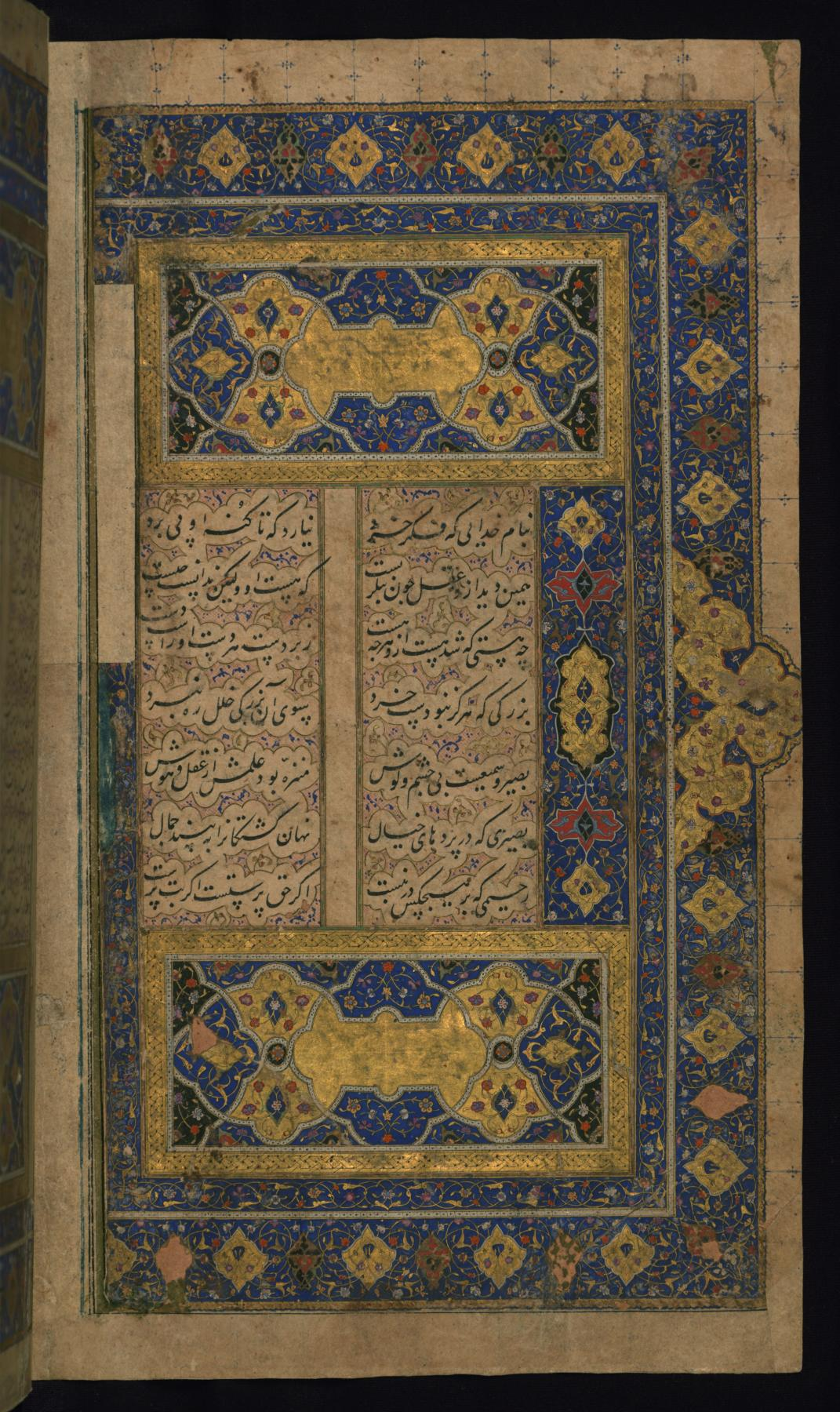
Page of an illuminated and illustrated manuscript of the Timurnama (Walters manuscript W.648)

In the tradition of the Khamsa of Nizami and that of Amir Khusrau, Hatefi also aspired to write a Khamsa. Nizami's and Amir Khusrau's fourth poems both retell the Alexander Romance, an account of the life and exploits of Alexander the Great. Hatefi substituted this narration of the life of Alexander with an epic about Timur. The scholar Carles Melville argues that Hatefi thereby "implicitly identify[ed] Timur as another Alexander." Hatefi, however, did not model his work on Nizami or Amir Khusrau, but after Ferdowsi's Shahnameh.

The Timurnama was written between 1492 and 1498. Hatefi's main source of information on the life of Timur was the Zafarnama of Sharaf al-Din Ali Yazdi (d. 1454). He wrote his poem for the court of Badi' al-Zaman Mirza.

The number of manuscripts of the Timurnama which have been preserved suggest that the work was highly regarded. The Encyclopædia Iranica notes that it is "certainly the most famous of Hātefi's poems".

== Content ==
The content of the poem cannot be deemed to be a historical account of the life of Timur. The scholar Bernardini argues that it is a "literary effort to confer an aura of superhumanity over trivial historical facts".

== Manuscripts and publications ==
=== Manuscripts ===
Many manuscripts of the Timurnama have survived; Bernardini lists 141 manuscripts of the poem in his provisional list. Notable ones include the following:

- Ms Persan 357 in the Bibliothèque Nationale de France by Sulṭān-ʿAlī al-Qāʾinī al-Sultānī. The manuscript has been digitized.
- Ms Barb.or.104 in the Vatican Apostolic Library by Mu˙sin b. Lu†fullàh Ma'àd Óusaynì Sabzavàrì. The manuscript has been digitized.
- Object 2014.392 in the Harvard Art Museums by Mahmud ibn Ishaq Siyavushani. The 1520 manuscript has been digitized.
- Ms 2102 in the Abu Rayhan Biruni Institute of Oriental Studies of the Academy of Sciences of Uzbekistan dated 1568 by ʿAli Riza al-Katib.
- Ms 22703 in the British Library is an incomplete excerpt of the original and has no colophon. It was made between the 1540s and 1570s in Bukhara.
Folios from Ms. 2102 (Timurnama dated 1568)

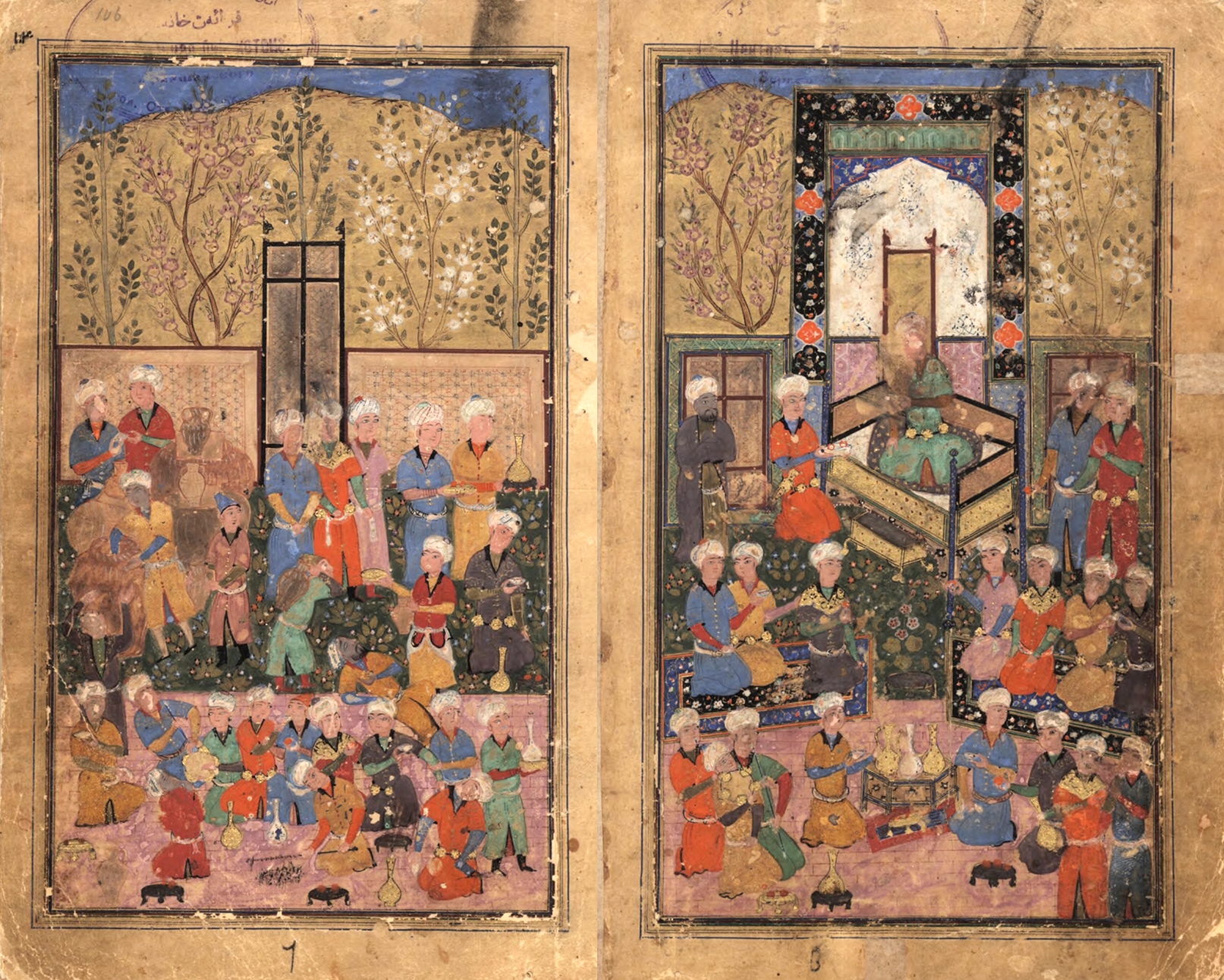
Frontispiece of the manuscript (folios 105r–106v.).

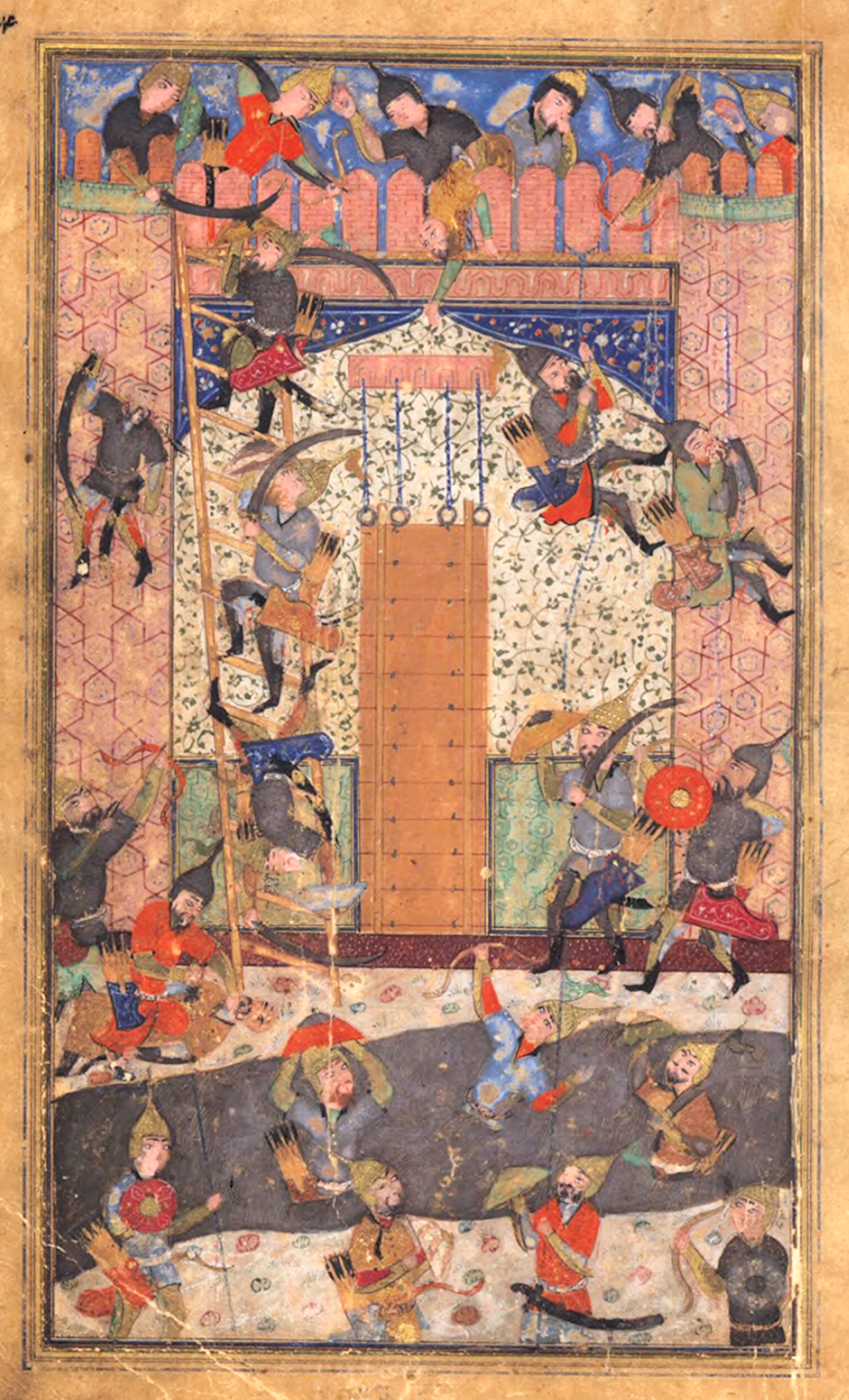
Timur besieging a fortress in Khorasan (folio 45v of the manuscript).

=== Publications ===
The Timurnama has been published in 1869 and 1958 in India. However, no critical edition of the text has been produced. The 1958 edition is based on "two manuscripts available in the Government Oriental Manuscripts Library, Madras" and is "both erroneous and defective at a number of places".

- Hatifi, Abdullah (1869). Ẓafar-nāma-ye Hātefi. Lucknow.
- Hatifi, Abdullah (1958). Yuša, A. S. (ed.). Timur Nama. Madras University Islamic Series. Vol. 19. University of Madras.

== See also ==
- Zafarnama (Yazdi biography) – Book of victories, one of the best-known sources of Timur's life
- Khamsa of Nizami (British Library, Or. 12208) – Mughal illuminated manuscript
