= Laj, Razavi Khorasan =

Neighborhood in Razavi Khorasan province, Iran

Laj Persian: لاج
- Neighborhood
- Location within Iran
- Coordinates: 34°35′28″N 60°06′55″E
- Country: Iran
- Province: Razavi Khorasan
- County: Khaf
- District: Central
- City: Khaf

Population (2006)
  - Total: 3,038
- Time zone: UTC+3:30 (IRST)

Laj (Persian: لاج) (Note: Also romanized as Lāj) is a neighborhood in the city of Khaf in the Central District of Khaf County, Razavi Khorasan province, Iran.

== Demographics ==
=== Population ===
At the time of the 2006 National Census, Laj's population was 3,038 in 622 households, when it was a village in Miyan Khaf Rural District. After the census, the village was annexed by the city of Khaf.
