= Hatefi =

Persian poet (1454–1521)

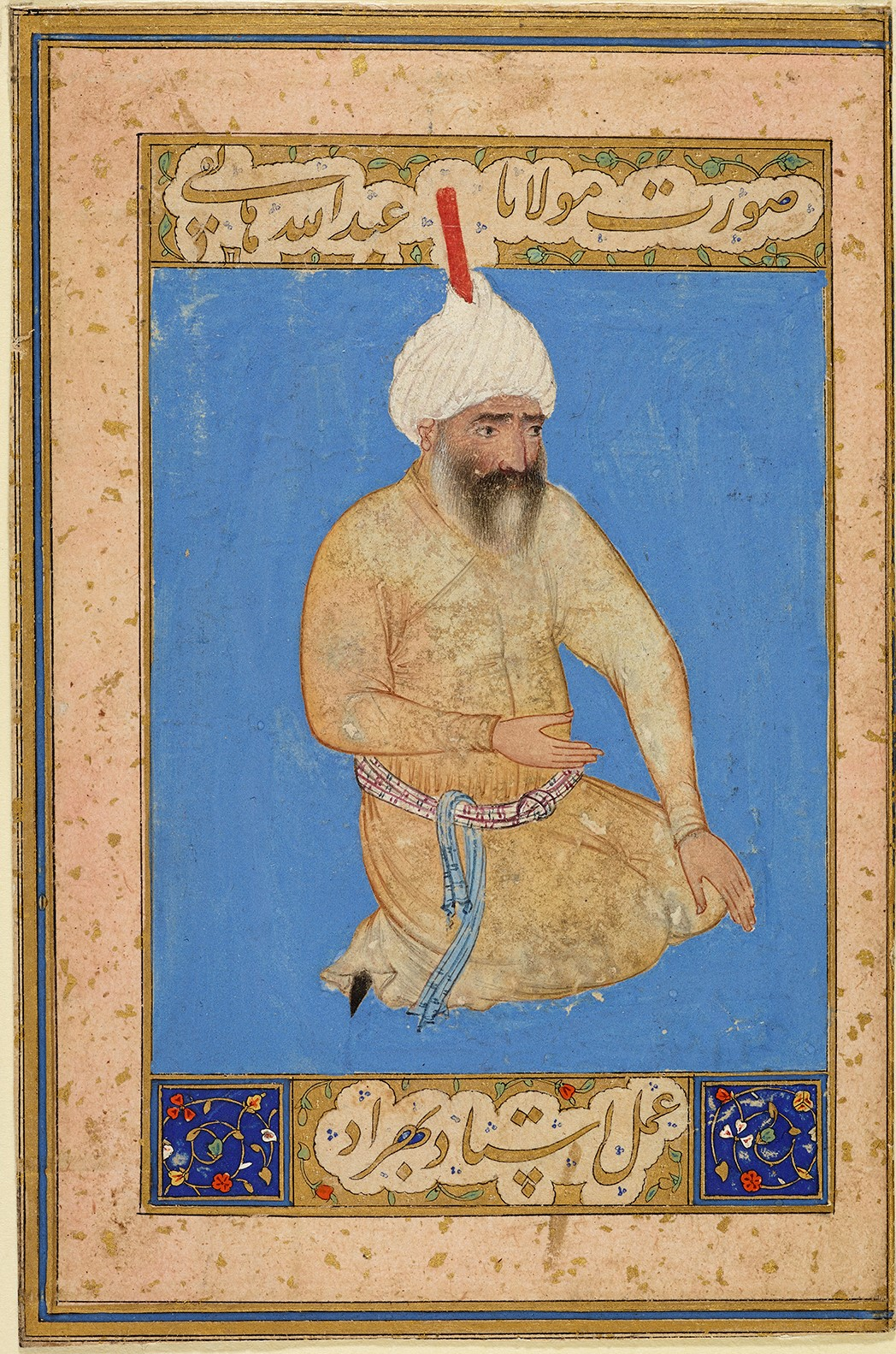
- Portrait of Hatefi by Kamal ud-Din Behzad
- Born: 1454; Khargerd, Khorasan, Timurid Empire
- Died: 1521 (aged 66–67); Khargerd, Khorasan, Safavid Iran
- Occupation: Poet
- Relatives: Jami (uncle)
- Writing career
- Notable works: Timurnama; Khamsa of Hatefi

Abd-Allah Hatefi, commonly known as Hatefi (also spelled Hatifi; Persian: هاتفی; 1454 – 1521) was a Persian poet and nephew of the distinguished poet Jami (died 1492).

== Life ==
Hatefi was born in 1454 in Khar Gerd, a village that formed a district of the town Torbat-e Jam, which was in turn a dependency of the Khwarezmian city of Herat. Hatefi's mother was a sister of the distinguished poet Jami (died 1492). Unlike his Sunni uncle, Hatefi was a Twelver Shi'a. Jami spent most of his whole life in his hometown, where he served as the custodian of the mausoleum of the Timurid-era poet Qasim-i Anvar. Hatefi became part of the literary elite after prevailing in a test set up by Jami. In the late 15th century, Hatefi travelled alongside fellow poet Amir Homayun Esfaraini to Iranian Azerbaijan and Lower Mesopotamia. Between 1485 and 1490, Hatefi stayed at the court of the Aq Qoyunlu ruler Ya'qub Beg (r. 1478–1490) in Tabriz in northwestern Iran.

Because he was a Shi'a, Hatefi was respected by the Safavid emperor Ismail I (r. 1501–1524), who had conquered Khorasan in 1510. Hatefi later acted as a mediator for the Sunni population of Jam, who were seen negatively by the emperor. Ismail, who sought to associate himself with Persian literature, requested Hatefi to write a historical epic similar to that of his previous Timurnama (also known as the Zafurnama), a biography of the Turco-Mongol ruler Timur (r. 1370–1405).

Hatefi died in 1521 in Khar Gerd and was buried in his former garden.

== Works ==
Hatefi composed poetry in several genres, but he is known above all for his Khamsa "Pentalogue". Modelled after previous pentologues of Persian literature, including those of Nizami Ganjavi, his Khamsa became famous even outside of Iran. Lami'i Chelebi produced an Ottoman Turkish translation of his work, and the several editions of his Khamsa from the Ottoman Empire and in India are proof of his widespread fame. Hatefi's literary fame rests on his realistic and straightforward style. He displayed remarkable originality in handling his stories with his style often emulated by later poets. Four of his works in his Khamsa have been published thus far.

The five works which are comprised by his Khamsa are:

- Layli o Majnun
- Shirin o Khosrow
- Haft manzar
- Timurnama (also known as Zafarnama)
- Fotuhat-e shahi

== See also ==
- List of Persian poets and authors
- Persian literature

== Sources ==
- Bernardini, Michele (2003). "Hātefi, ʿAbd-Allāh". In Yarshater, Ehsan (ed.). Encyclopædia Iranica. Vol. XII/1: Harem I–Hedāyat al-mota'allemin. London and New York: Routledge & Kegan Paul. pp. 55–57. ISBN 978-0-933273-74-0.
- Huart, Cl. & Massé, H. (1971). "Hātifī". In Lewis, B.; Ménage, V. L.; Pellat, Ch. & Schacht, J. (eds.). The Encyclopaedia of Islam, Second Edition. Volume III: H–Iram. Leiden: E. J. Brill. p. 274. OCLC 495469525.
- Lingwood, Chad (2013). Politics, Poetry, and Sufism in Medieval Iran: New Perspectives on Jāmī's Salāmān va Absāl. Brill. ISBN 978-9004254046.
- Newman, Andrew J. (2008). Safavid Iran: Rebirth of a Persian Empire. I.B.Tauris. pp. 1–296. ISBN 978-0857716613.
