= Bazguy =

Village in Razavi Khorasan province, Iran

Bazguy Persian: بازگوي
- Village
- Location within Iran
- Coordinates: 34°29′06″N 60°03′29″E
- Country: Iran
- Province: Razavi Khorasan
- County: Khaf
- District: Central
- Rural District: Nashtifan

Population (2016)
  - Total: 90
- Time zone: UTC+3:30 (IRST)

Bazguy (Persian: بازگوي) (Note: Also romanized as Bāzgūy) is a village in Nashtifan Rural District of the Central District in Khaf County, Razavi Khorasan province, Iran.

== Demographics ==
=== Population ===
At the time of the 2006 National Census, the village's population was 122 in 24 households. The following census in 2011 counted 138 people in 31 households. The 2016 census measured the population of the village as 90 people in 26 households.
