= Arzaneh, Khaf =

Village in Razavi Khorasan province, Iran

Arzaneh Persian: ارزنه
- Village
- Location within Iran
- Coordinates: 34°29′55″N 60°01′51″E
- Country: Iran
- Province: Razavi Khorasan
- County: Khaf
- District: Central
- Rural District: Miyan Khaf

Population (2016)
  - Total: 209
- Time zone: UTC+3:30 (IRST)

Arzaneh (Persian: ارزنه) is a village in Miyan Khaf Rural District of the Central District in Khaf County, Razavi Khorasan province, Iran.

== Demographics ==
=== Population ===
At the time of the 2006 National Census, the village's population was 255 in 46 households. The following census in 2011 counted 264 people in 66 households. The 2016 census measured the population of the village as 209 people in 48 households.
