= Posht-e Sabad =

Village in Razavi Khorasan province, Iran

Posht-e Sabad Persian: پشت ساباد
- Village
- Location within Iran
- Coordinates: 34°26′52″N 60°05′32″E
- Country: Iran
- Province: Razavi Khorasan
- County: Khaf
- District: Central
- Rural District: Nashtifan

Population (2016)
  - Total: 174
- Time zone: UTC+3:30 (IRST)

Posht-e Sabad (Persian: پشت ساباد) (Note: Also romanized as Posht-e Sābād) is a village in Nashtifan Rural District of the Central District in Khaf County, Razavi Khorasan province, Iran.

== Demographics ==
=== Population ===
At the time of the 2006 National Census, the village's population was 213 in 47 households. The following census in 2011 counted 178 people in 43 households. The 2016 census measured the population of the village as 174 people in 45 households.
