= Razan, Razavi Khorasan =

Village in Razavi Khorasan province, Iran

Razan Persian: رزان
- Village
- Location within Iran
- Coordinates: 34°28′05″N 60°04′22″E
- Country: Iran
- Province: Razavi Khorasan
- County: Khaf
- District: Central
- Rural District: Nashtifan

Population (2016)
  - Total: 205
- Time zone: UTC+3:30 (IRST)

Razan (Persian: رزان) (Note: Also romanized as Razān; also known as Vazān) is a village in Nashtifan Rural District of the Central District in Khaf County, Razavi Khorasan province, Iran.

== Demographics ==
=== Population ===
At the time of the 2006 National Census, the village's population was 291 in 61 households. The following census in 2011 counted 254 people in 65 households. The 2016 census measured the population of the village as 205 people in 52 households.
