= Fayandar =

Village in Razavi Khorasan province, Iran

Fayandar Persian: فايندر
- Village
- Location within Iran
- Coordinates: 34°39′33″N 60°05′52″E
- Country: Iran
- Province: Razavi Khorasan
- County: Khaf
- District: Central
- Rural District: Miyan Khaf

Population (2016)
  - Total: 1,285
- Time zone: UTC+3:30 (IRST)

Fayandar (Persian: فايندر) (Note: Also romanized as Fāyandar; also known as Fanidar and Pā’īn Dar) is a village in Miyan Khaf Rural District of the Central District in Khaf County, Razavi Khorasan province, Iran.

== Demographics ==
=== Population ===
At the time of the 2006 National Census, the village's population was 1,161 in 207 households. The following census in 2011 counted 1,196 people in 252 households. The 2016 census measured the population of the village as 1,285 people in 321 households.
