= Mohammadabad, Nashtifan =

Village in Razavi Khorasan province, Iran

Mohammadabad Persian: محمداباد
- Village
- Location within Iran
- Coordinates: 34°28′14″N 60°03′36″E
- Country: Iran
- Province: Razavi Khorasan
- County: Khaf
- District: Central
- Rural District: Nashtifan

Population (2016)
  - Total: 433
- Time zone: UTC+3:30 (IRST)

Mohammadabad (Persian: محمداباد) (Note: Also romanized as Moḩammadābād) is a village in Nashtifan Rural District of the Central District in Khaf County, Razavi Khorasan province, Iran.

== Demographics ==
=== Population ===
At the time of the 2006 National Census, the village's population was 345 in 84 households. The following census in 2011 counted 403 people in 103 households. The 2016 census measured the population of the village as 433 people in 125 households, the most populous in its rural district.
