= Barakuh =

Barakuh (Persian: براكوه) may refer to:

- Barakuh, Khvaf, Razavi Khorasan Province
- Barakuh, Rashtkhvar, Razavi Khorasan Province
- Barakuh Rural District, in South Khorasan Province
