= Harashi =

Village in Razavi Khorasan province, Iran

Harashi Persian: هرشي
- Village
- Location within Iran
- Coordinates: 34°24′32″N 60°06′15″E
- Country: Iran
- Province: Razavi Khorasan
- County: Khaf
- District: Central
- Rural District: Nashtifan

Population (2016)
  - Total: 127
- Time zone: UTC+3:30 (IRST)

Harashi (Persian: هرشي) (Note: Also romanized as Harashī) is a village in Nashtifan Rural District of the Central District in Khaf County, Razavi Khorasan province, Iran.

== Demographics ==
=== Population ===
At the time of the 2006 National Census, the village's population was 121 in 23 households. The following census in 2011 counted 132 people in 31 households. The 2016 census measured the population of the village as 127 people in 29 households.
