= Hafizabad, Khaf =

Village in Razavi Khorasan province, Iran

Hafizabad Persian: حفيظاباد
- Village
- Location within Iran
- Coordinates: 34°29′34″N 60°02′22″E
- Country: Iran
- Province: Razavi Khorasan
- County: Khaf
- District: Central
- Rural District: Miyan Khaf

Population (2016)
  - Total: 177
- Time zone: UTC+3:30 (IRST)

Hafizabad (Persian: حفيظاباد) (Note: Also romanized as Ḩafīz̧ābād; also known as Afsābād, Feyẕābād, and Ḩafaz̧ābād) is a village in Miyan Khaf Rural District of the Central District in Khaf County, Razavi Khorasan province, Iran.

== Demographics ==
=== Population ===
At the time of the 2006 National Census, the village's population was 230 in 45 households. The following census in 2011 counted 227 people in 56 households. The 2016 census measured the population of the village as 177 people in 47 households.
