= Dasht, Khaf =

Village in Razavi Khorasan province, Iran

Dasht Persian: دشت
- Village
- Location within Iran
- Coordinates: 34°30′39″N 60°09′07″E
- Country: Iran
- Province: Razavi Khorasan
- County: Khaf
- District: Central
- Rural District: Miyan Khaf

Population (2016)
  - Total: 139
- Time zone: UTC+3:30 (IRST)

Dasht (Persian: دشت) is a village in Miyan Khaf Rural District of the Central District in Khaf County, Razavi Khorasan province, Iran.

== Demographics ==
=== Population ===
At the time of the 2006 National Census, the village's population was 125 in 28 households. The following census in 2011 counted 107 people in 30 households. The 2016 census measured the population of the village as 139 people in 35 households.
