= Neqab, Khaf =

Village in Razavi Khorasan province, Iran

Neqab Persian: نقاب
- Village
- Location within Iran
- Coordinates: 34°28′06″N 60°02′14″E
- Country: Iran
- Province: Razavi Khorasan
- County: Khaf
- District: Central
- Rural District: Nashtifan

Population (2016)
  - Total: 121
- Time zone: UTC+3:30 (IRST)

Neqab (Persian: نقاب) (Note: Also romanized as Neqāb) is a village in Nashtifan Rural District of the Central District in Khaf County, Razavi Khorasan province, Iran.

== Demographics ==
=== Population ===
At the time of the 2006 National Census, the village's population was 136 in 27 households. The following census in 2011 counted 137 people in 38 households. The 2016 census measured the population of the village as 121 people in 34 households.
