= Cheshmeh Mazar =

Village in Razavi Khorasan province, Iran

Cheshmeh Mazar Persian: چشمه مزار
- Village
- Location within Iran
- Coordinates: 34°24′14″N 60°05′19″E
- Country: Iran
- Province: Razavi Khorasan
- County: Khaf
- District: Central
- Rural District: Nashtifan

Population (2016)
  - Total: 187
- Time zone: UTC+3:30 (IRST)

Cheshmeh Mazar (Persian: چشمه مزار) (Note: Also romanized as Cheshmeh Mazār; also known as Cheshmeh Marār) is a village in Nashtifan Rural District of the Central District in Khaf County, Razavi Khorasan province, Iran.

== Demographics ==
=== Population ===
At the time of the 2006 National Census, the village's population was 150 in 34 households. The following census in 2011 counted 174 people in 38 households. The 2016 census measured the population of the village as 187 people in 39 households.
