= Varab =

Varab may refer to:

- Jeffrey J. Varab, American animator
- Voru, Razavi Khorasan, village in Iran
