= Tiz Ab, Razavi Khorasan =

Village in Razavi Khorasan province, Iran

Tiz Ab Persian: تيزاب
- Village
- Location within Iran
- Coordinates: 34°30′49″N 60°10′34″E
- Country: Iran
- Province: Razavi Khorasan
- County: Khaf
- District: Central
- Rural District: Miyan Khaf

Population (2016)
  - Total: 1,061
- Time zone: UTC+3:30 (IRST)

Tiz Ab (Persian: تيزاب) (Note: Also romanized as Tīz Āb) is a village in Miyan Khaf Rural District of the Central District in Khaf County, Razavi Khorasan province, Iran.

== Demographics ==
=== Population ===
At the time of the 2006 National Census, the village's population was 1,017 in 236 households. The following census in 2011 counted 1,045 people in 266 households. The 2016 census measured the population of the village as 1,061 people in 267 households.
