= Baghcheh, Khaf =

Village in Razavi Khorasan province, Iran

Baghcheh Persian: باغچه
- Village
- Location within Iran
- Coordinates: 34°25′56″N 60°06′29″E
- Country: Iran
- Province: Razavi Khorasan
- County: Khaf
- District: Central
- Rural District: Nashtifan

Population (2016)
  - Total: 71
- Time zone: UTC+3:30 (IRST)

Baghcheh (Persian: باغچه) (Note: Also romanized as Bāghcheh) is a village in Nashtifan Rural District of the Central District in Khaf County, Razavi Khorasan province, Iran.

== Demographics ==
=== Population ===
At the time of the 2006 National Census, the village's population was 78 in 17 households. The following census in 2011 counted 81 people in 24 households. The 2016 census measured the population of the village as 71 people in 20 households.
