= Kojnah =

Village in Razavi Khorasan province, Iran

Kojnah Persian: كجنه
- Village
- Location within Iran
- Coordinates: 34°30′08″N 60°09′30″E
- Country: Iran
- Province: Razavi Khorasan
- County: Khaf
- District: Central
- Rural District: Miyan Khaf

Population (2016)
  - Total: 18
- Time zone: UTC+3:30 (IRST)

Kojnah (Persian: كجنه) is a village in Miyan Khaf Rural District of the Central District in Khaf County, Razavi Khorasan province, Iran.

== Demographics ==
=== Population ===
At the time of the 2006 National Census, the village's population was 64 in 10 households. The following census in 2011 counted 39 people in nine households. The 2016 census measured the population of the village as 18 people in five households.
