= Bid Parsi =

Village in Razavi Khorasan province, Iran

Bid Parsi Persian: بيدپارسي
- Village
- Location within Iran
- Coordinates: 34°42′17″N 60°12′16″E
- Country: Iran
- Province: Razavi Khorasan
- County: Khaf
- District: Central
- Rural District: Miyan Khaf

Population (2016)
  - Total: 269
- Time zone: UTC+3:30 (IRST)

Bid Parsi (Persian: بيدپارسي) (Note: Also romanized as Bīd Pārsī; also known as Ḩabībābād) is a village in Miyan Khaf Rural District of the Central District in Khaf County, Razavi Khorasan province, Iran.

== Demographics ==
=== Population ===
At the time of the 2006 National Census, the village's population was 282 in 62 households. The following census in 2011 counted 283 people in 66 households. The 2016 census measured the population of the village as 269 people in 77 households.
