= Mehrabad, Khaf =

Village in Razavi Khorasan province, Iran

Mehrabad Persian: مهراباد
- Village
- Location within Iran
- Coordinates: 34°29′20″N 60°11′29″E
- Country: Iran
- Province: Razavi Khorasan
- County: Khaf
- District: Central
- Rural District: Miyan Khaf

Population (2016)
  - Total: 2,495
- Time zone: UTC+3:30 (IRST)

Mehrabad (Persian: مهراباد) (Note: Also romanized as Mehrābād; also known as Mihrābād) is a village in Miyan Khaf Rural District of the Central District in Khaf County, Razavi Khorasan province, Iran.

== Demographics ==
=== Population ===
At the time of the 2006 National Census, the village's population was 2,023 in 412 households. The following census in 2011 counted 2,399 people in 524 households. The 2016 census measured the population of the village as 2,495 people in 577 households, the most populous in its rural district.
