= Boqsani, Nashtifan =

Village in Razavi Khorasan province, Iran

Boqsani Persian: بقساني
- Village
- Location within Iran
- Coordinates: 34°28′47″N 60°03′13″E
- Country: Iran
- Province: Razavi Khorasan
- County: Khaf
- District: Central
- Rural District: Nashtifan

Population (2016)
  - Total: 344
- Time zone: UTC+3:30 (IRST)

Boqsani (Persian: بقساني) (Note: Also romanized as Boqşānī; also known as Beḩsānī, Bokhsānī, and Boqşānī-ye ‘Olyā) is a village in Nashtifan Rural District of the Central District in Khaf County, Razavi Khorasan province, Iran.

== Demographics ==
=== Population ===
At the time of the 2006 National Census, the village's population was 354 in 71 households. The following census in 2011 counted 369 people in 86 households. The 2016 census measured the population of the village as 344 people in 90 households.
