= Mahabad, Razavi Khorasan =

Village in Razavi Khorasan province, Iran

Mahabad Persian: مهاباد
- Village
- Location within Iran
- Coordinates: 34°34′52″N 60°03′51″E
- Country: Iran
- Province: Razavi Khorasan
- County: Khaf
- District: Central
- Rural District: Miyan Khaf

Population (2016)
  - Total: 144
- Time zone: UTC+3:30 (IRST)

Mahabad (Persian: مهاباد) (Note: Also romanized as Mahābād) is a village in Miyan Khaf Rural District of the Central District in Khaf County, Razavi Khorasan province, Iran.

== Demographics ==
=== Population ===
At the time of the 2006 National Census, the village's population was 160 in 34 households. A subsequent census in 2011 counted 130 people in 34 households. The 2016 census measured the population of the village as 144 people across 40 households.
