= Miyan Khaf Rural District =

Rural district in Razavi Khorasan province, Iran

Miyan Khaf Rural District Persian: دهستان ميان خواف
- Rural District
- Location within Iran
- Coordinates: 34°39′N 60°08′E
- Country: Iran
- Province: Razavi Khorasan
- County: Khaf
- District: Central
- Established: 1987
- Capital: Khar Gerd

Population (2016)
  - Total: 8,782
- Time zone: UTC+3:30 (IRST)

Miyan Khaf Rural District (Persian: دهستان ميان خواف) is in the Central District of Khaf County, Razavi Khorasan province, Iran. Its capital is the village of Khar Gerd.

== Demographics ==
=== Population ===
At the time of the 2006 National Census, the rural district's population was 11,135 in 2,317 households. There were 8,537 inhabitants in 1,991 households at the following census of 2011. The 2016 census measured the population of the rural district as 8,782 in 2,177 households. The most populous of its 29 villages was Mehrabad, with 2,495 people.

=== Other villages in the rural district ===
- Arzaneh
- Barakuh
- Bid Parsi
- Dasht
- Fayandar
- Gorazi
- Hafizabad
- Khajeh
- Kojnah
- Mahabad
- Tiz Ab
- Voru

== See also ==
- Laj, a former village and now a neighborhood in the city of Khaf
