= Gorazi, Khaf =

Village in Razavi Khorasan province, Iran

Gorazi Persian: گرازي
- Village
- Location within Iran
- Coordinates: 34°32′43″N 60°01′15″E
- Country: Iran
- Province: Razavi Khorasan
- County: Khaf
- District: Central
- Rural District: Miyan Khaf

Population (2016)
  - Total: 455
- Time zone: UTC+3:30 (IRST)

Gorazi (Persian: گرازي) (Note: Also romanized as Gorāzī) is a village in Miyan Khaf Rural District of the Central District in Khaf County, Razavi Khorasan province, Iran.

== Demographics ==
=== Population ===
At the time of the 2006 National Census, the village's population was 345 in 69 households. The following census in 2011 counted 376 people in 86 households. The 2016 census measured the population of the village as 455 people in 107 households.
