= Khajeh, Razavi Khorasan =

Village in Razavi Khorasan province, Iran

Khajeh Persian: خواجه
- Village
- Location within Iran
- Coordinates: 34°32′29″N 59°59′36″E
- Country: Iran
- Province: Razavi Khorasan
- County: Khaf
- District: Central
- Rural District: Miyan Khaf

Population (2016)
  - Total: 347
- Time zone: UTC+3:30 (IRST)

Khajeh (Persian: خواجه) (Note: Also romanized as Khājeh) is a village in Miyan Khaf Rural District of the Central District in Khaf County, Razavi Khorasan province, Iran.

== Demographics ==
=== Population ===
At the time of the 2006 National Census, the village's population was 287 in 61 households. The following census in 2011 counted 332 people in 78 households. The 2016 census measured the population of the village as 347 people in 81 households.
