= Nashtifan Rural District =

Rural district in Razavi Khorasan province, Iran

Nashtifan Rural District Persian: دهستان نشتيفان
- Rural District
- Location within Iran
- Coordinates: 34°24′N 60°07′E
- Country: Iran
- Province: Razavi Khorasan
- County: Khaf
- District: Central
- Established: 2002
- Capital: Nashtifan

Population (2016)
  - Total: 1,752
- Time zone: UTC+3:30 (IRST)

Nashtifan Rural District (Persian: دهستان نشتيفان) is in the Central District of Khaf County, Razavi Khorasan province, Iran. It is administered from the city of Nashtifan.

== Demographics ==
=== Population ===
At the time of the 2006 National Census, the rural district's population was 1,810 in 388 households. There were 1,866 inhabitants in 459 households at the following census of 2011. The 2016 census measured the population of the rural district as 1,752 in 460 households. The most populous of its 10 villages was Mohammadabad, with 433 people.

=== Other villages in the rural district ===
- Baghcheh
- Bazguy
- Boqsani
- Cheshmeh Mazar
- Harashi
- Neqab
- Posht-e Sabad
- Razan
