= Ghiasieh School, Khargerd =

Ghiasieh School
- مدرسه غیاثیه (Persian)
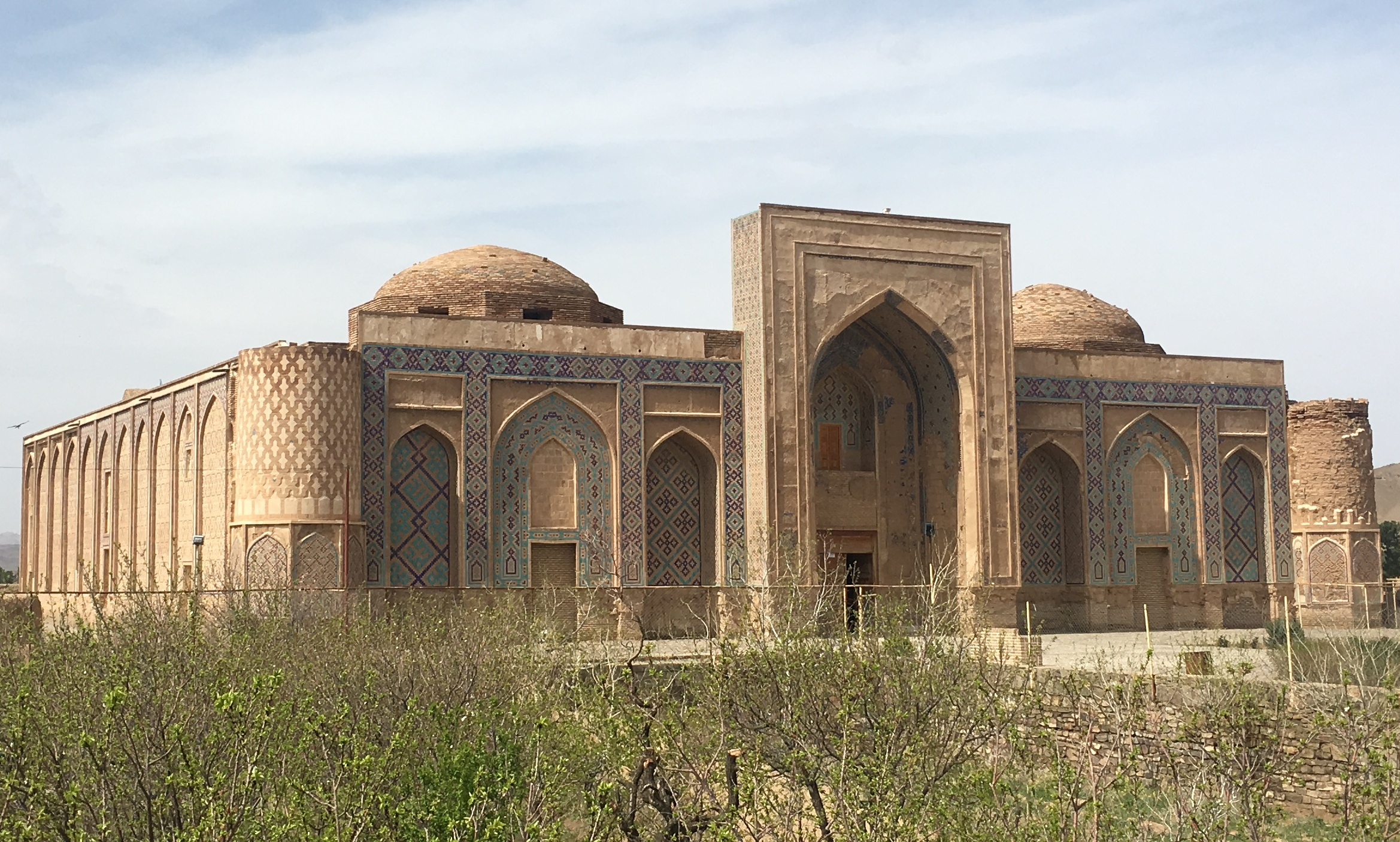
- Interactive map of Ghiasieh School
- 34.5324°N 60.1783°E
- Type: Madrasa
- Location: Khar Gerd, Iran

History
- Built: 1444 CE

Site notes
- Architect: Qavam ad-Din Shirazi
- Architectural style: Timurid

Iran National Heritage List
- Official name: Ghiasieh Religious School
- Type: Religious School
- Designated: 1932
- Reference no.: 126
- Conservation organization: Cultural Heritage, Handicrafts and Tourism Organization of Iran

The Ghiasieh School (Persian: مدرسه غیاثیه) or the Khargerd School (Persian: مدرسه خرگرد) is an historical madrasa in Khargerd, Iran.

== History ==
It was built in 1444 during the reign of Shahrukh Timurid by the order of his vizier, Sheikh Ahmad Khafi. The structure is made of bricks, and consists of 4 Iwans, 8 classrooms and 32 chambers used for students to rest in.

The former madrasa was added to the Iran National Heritage List in 1932, administered by the Cultural Heritage, Handicrafts and Tourism Organization of Iran.

== Gallery ==
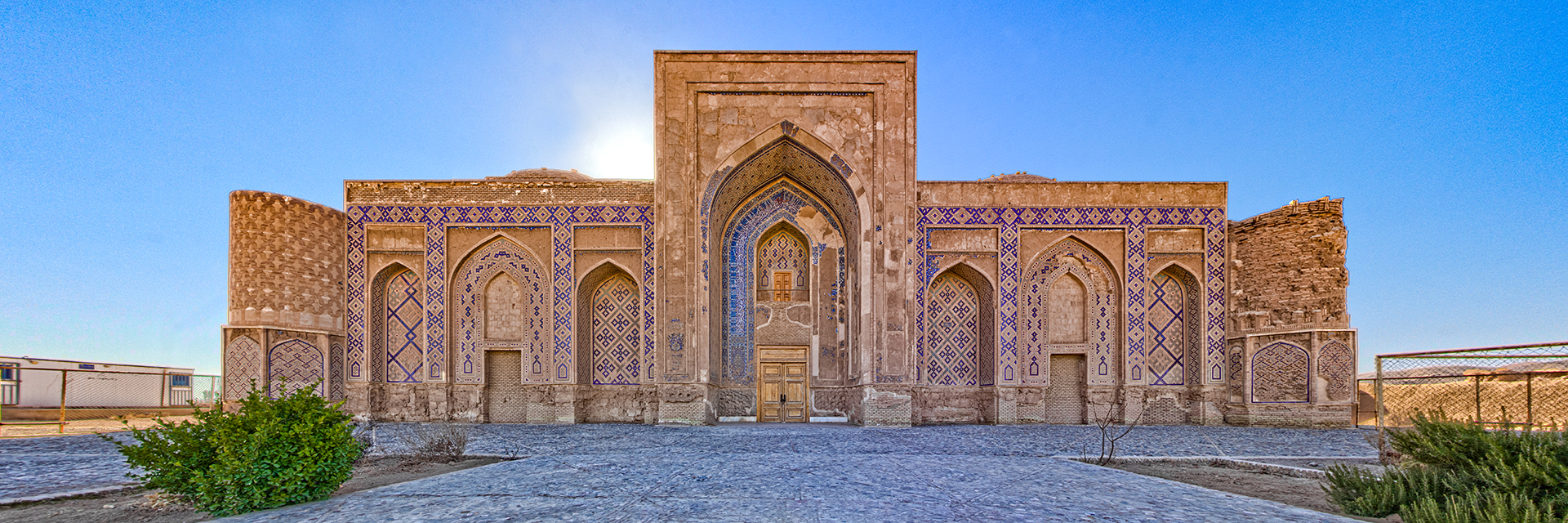

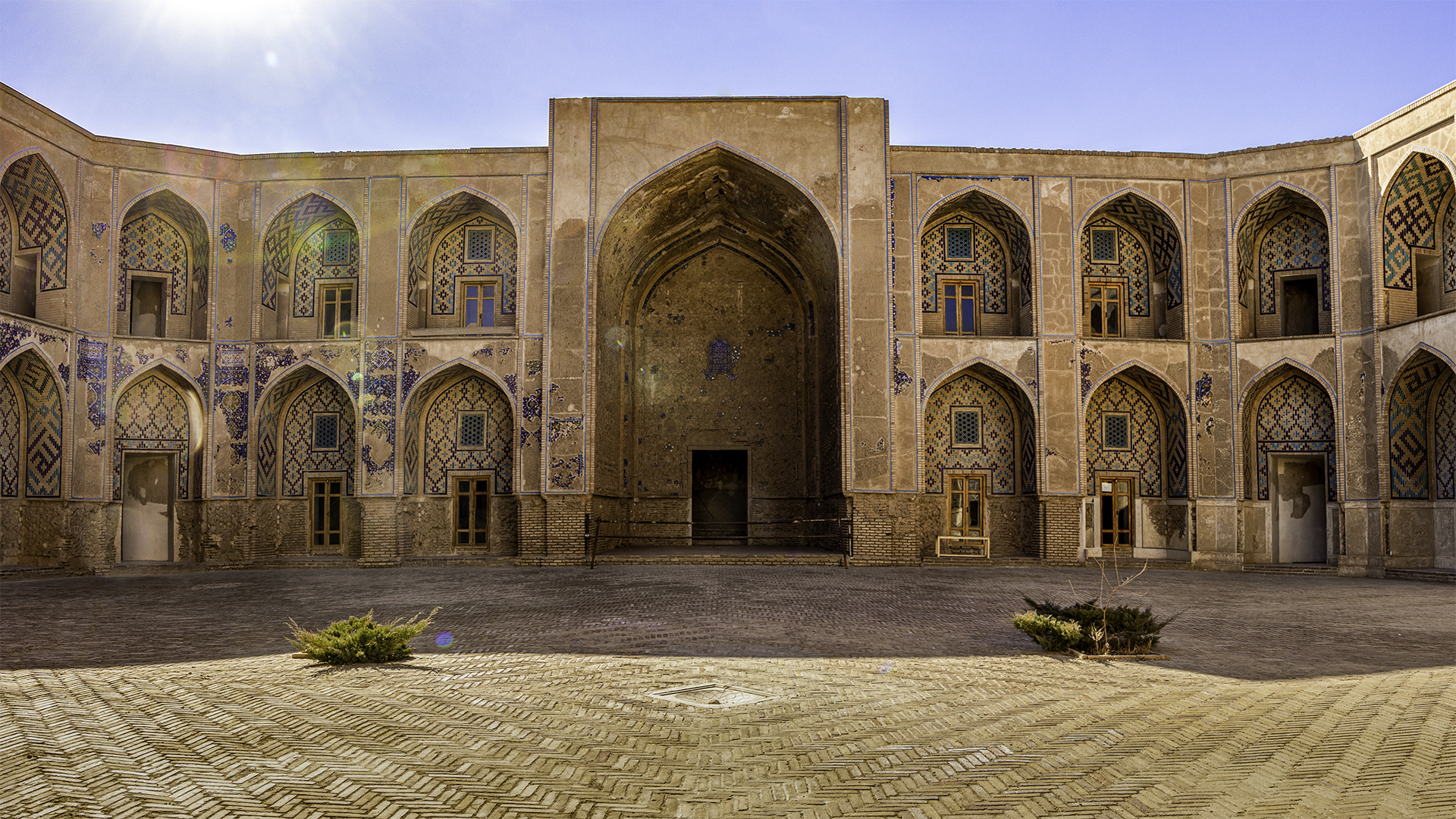

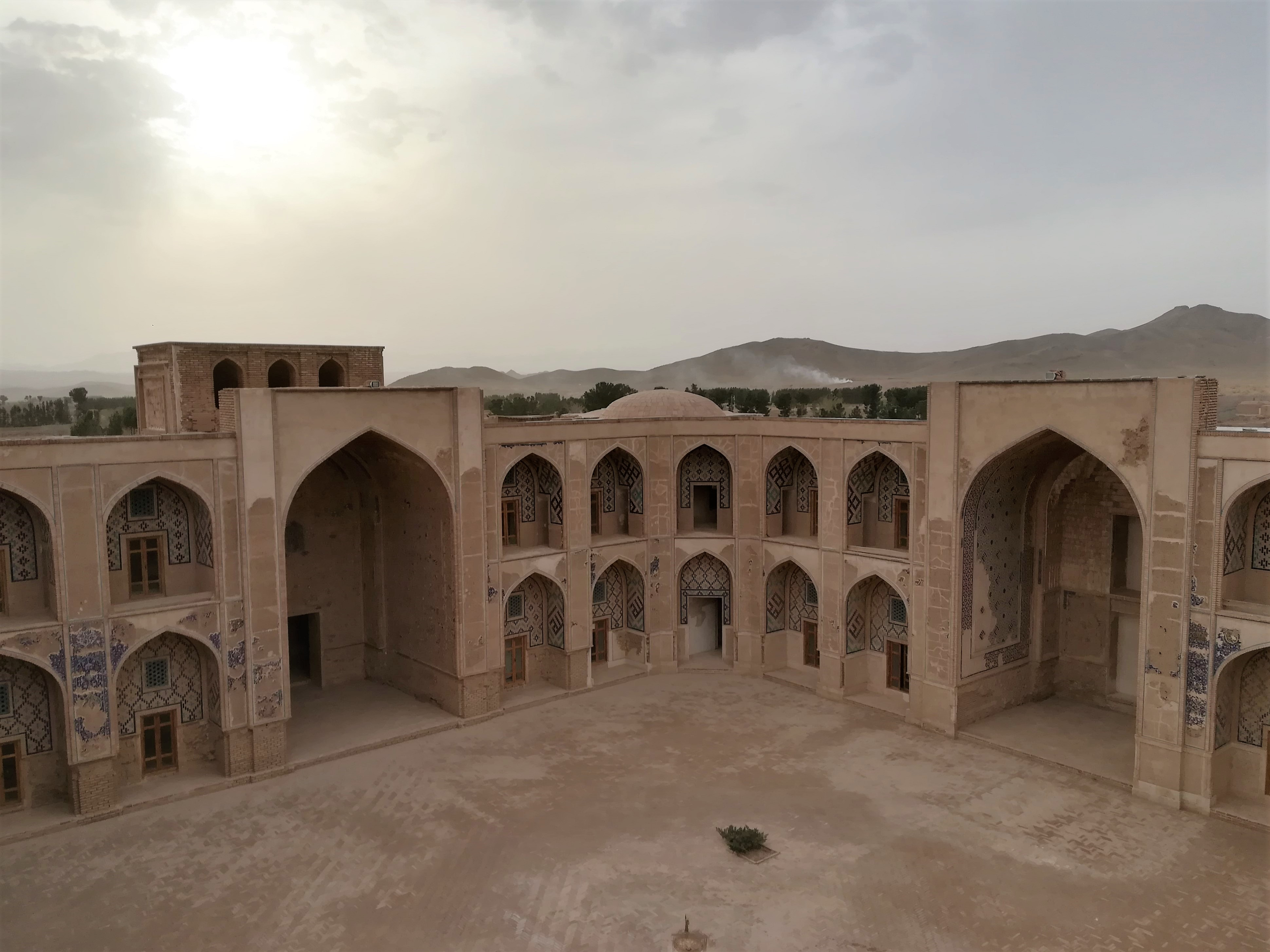

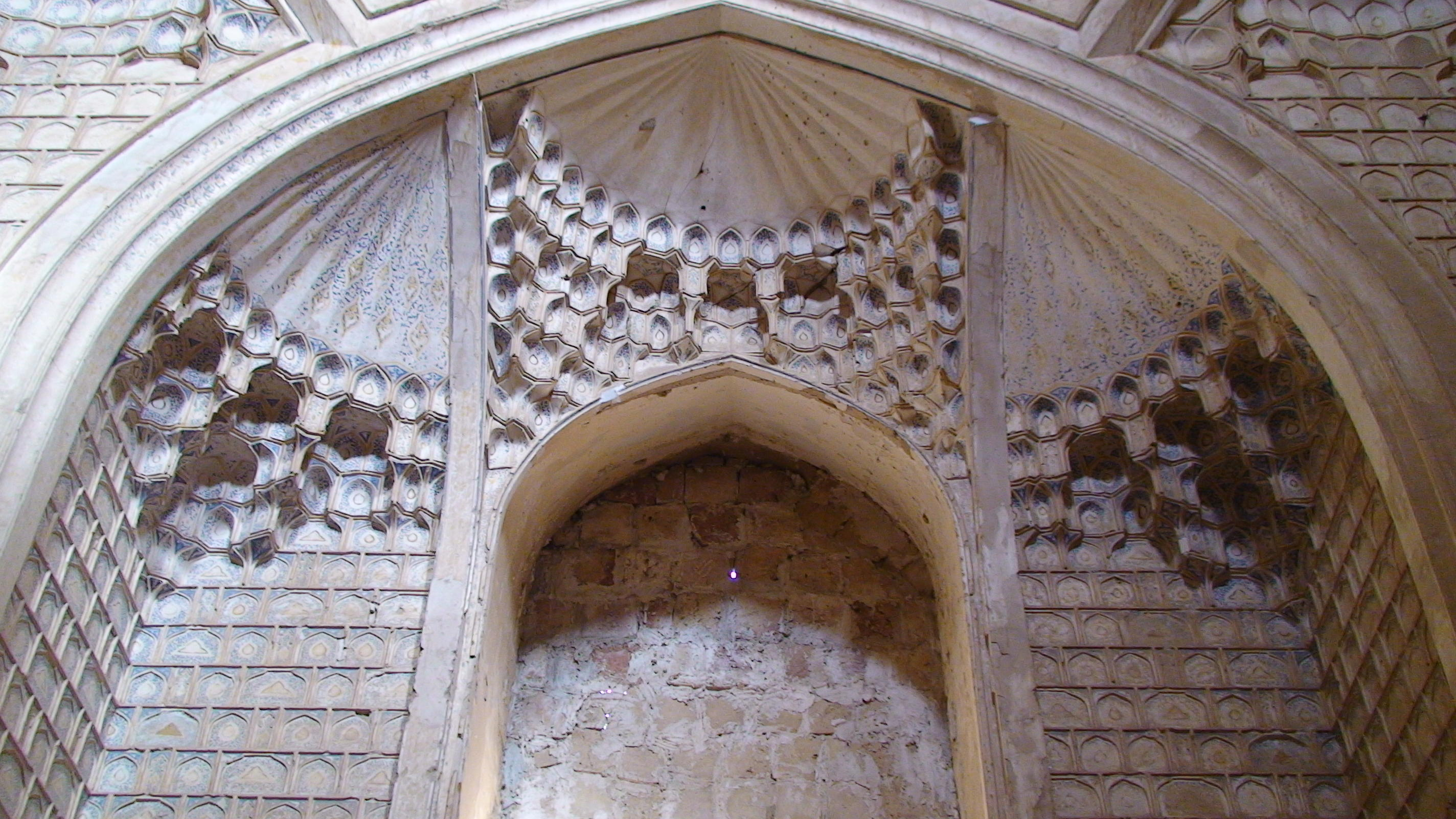

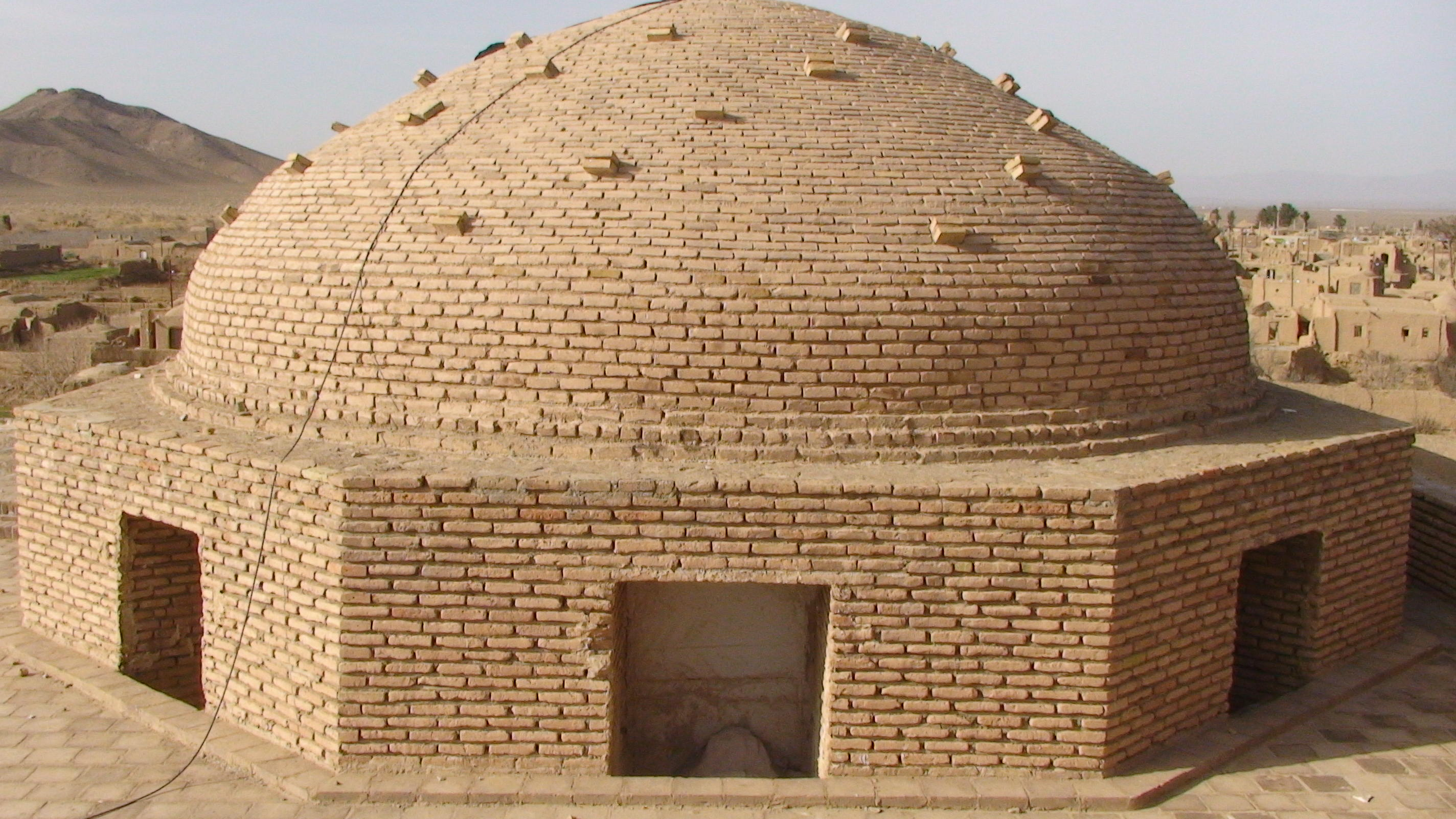

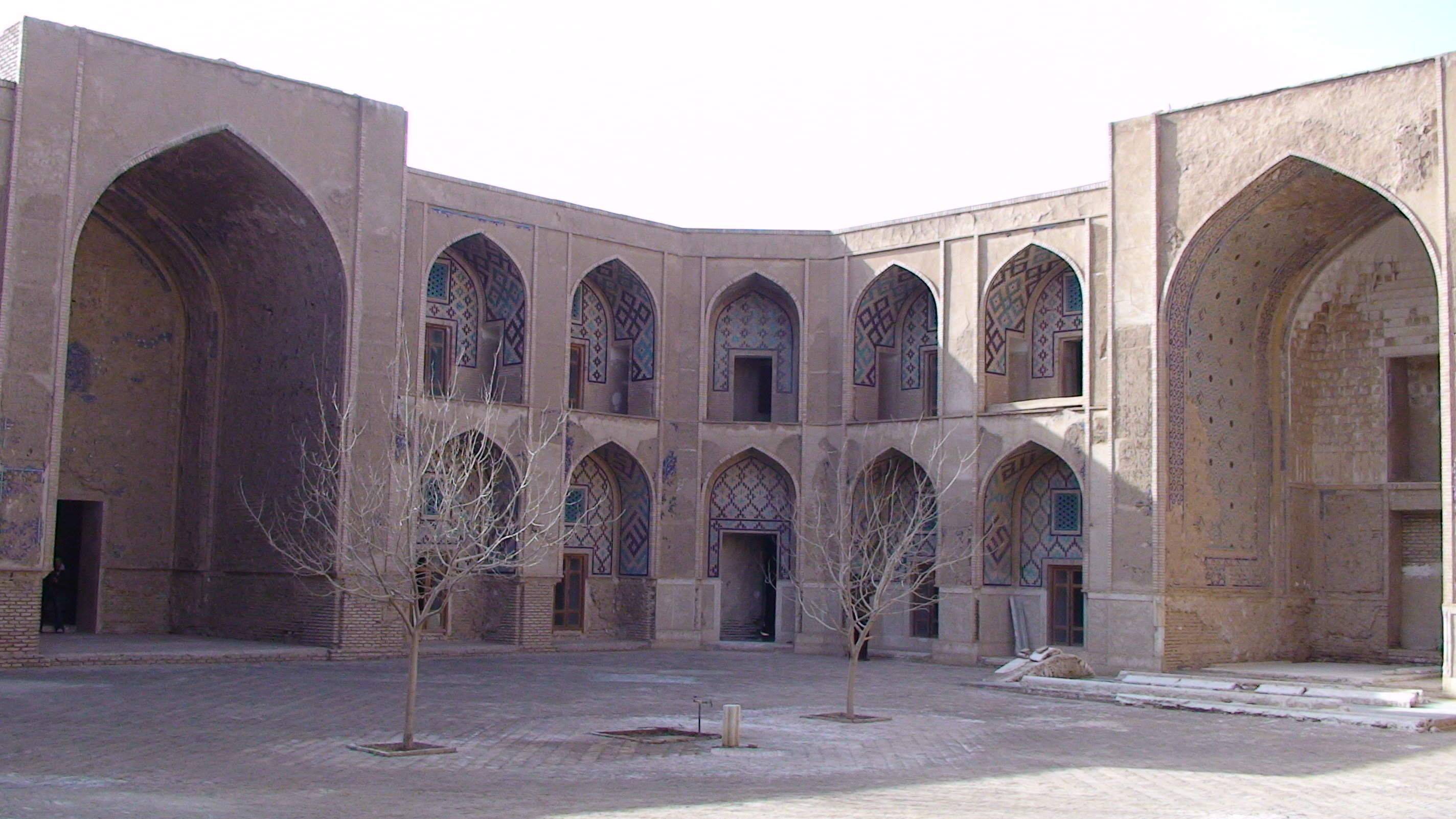

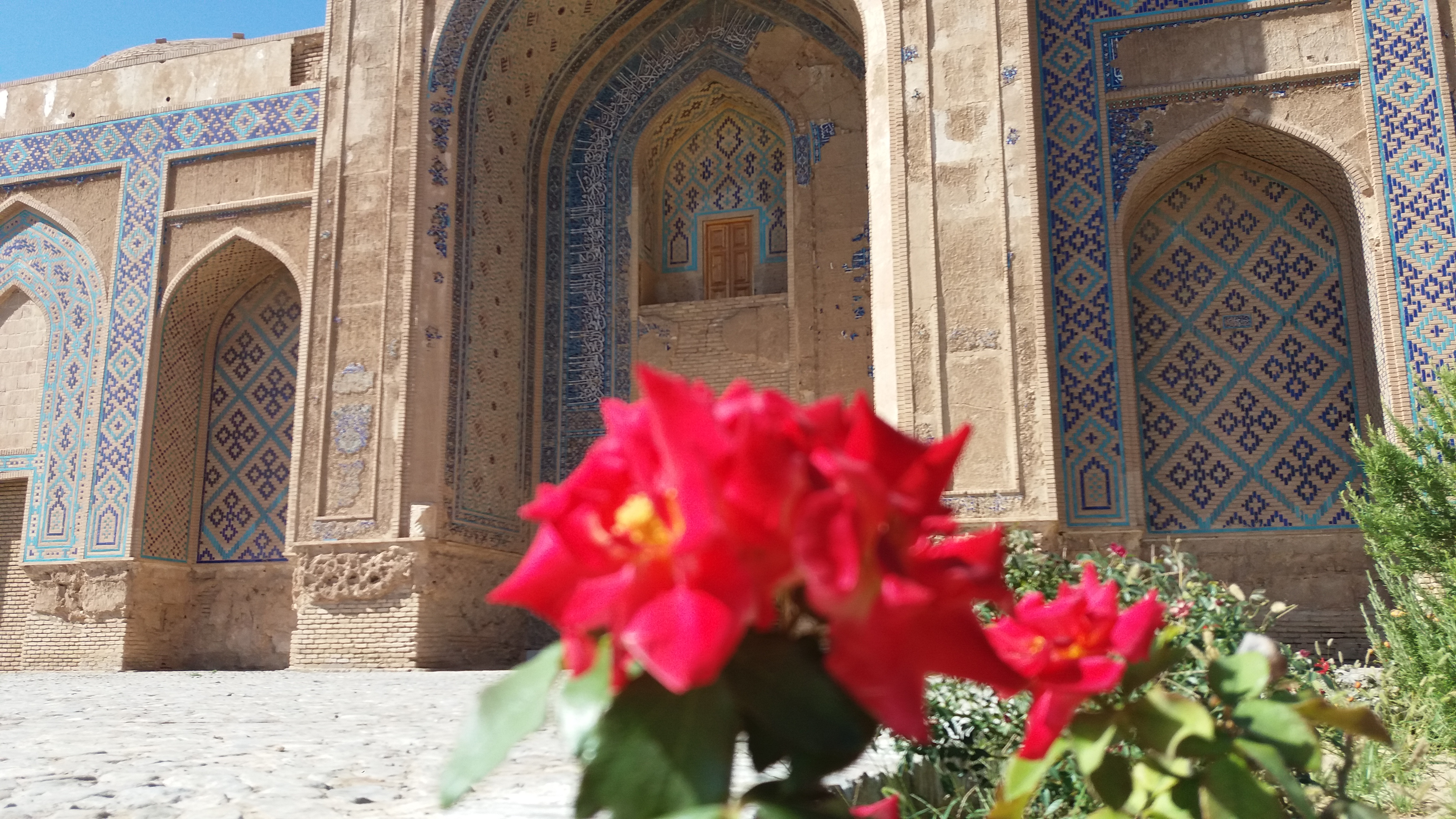

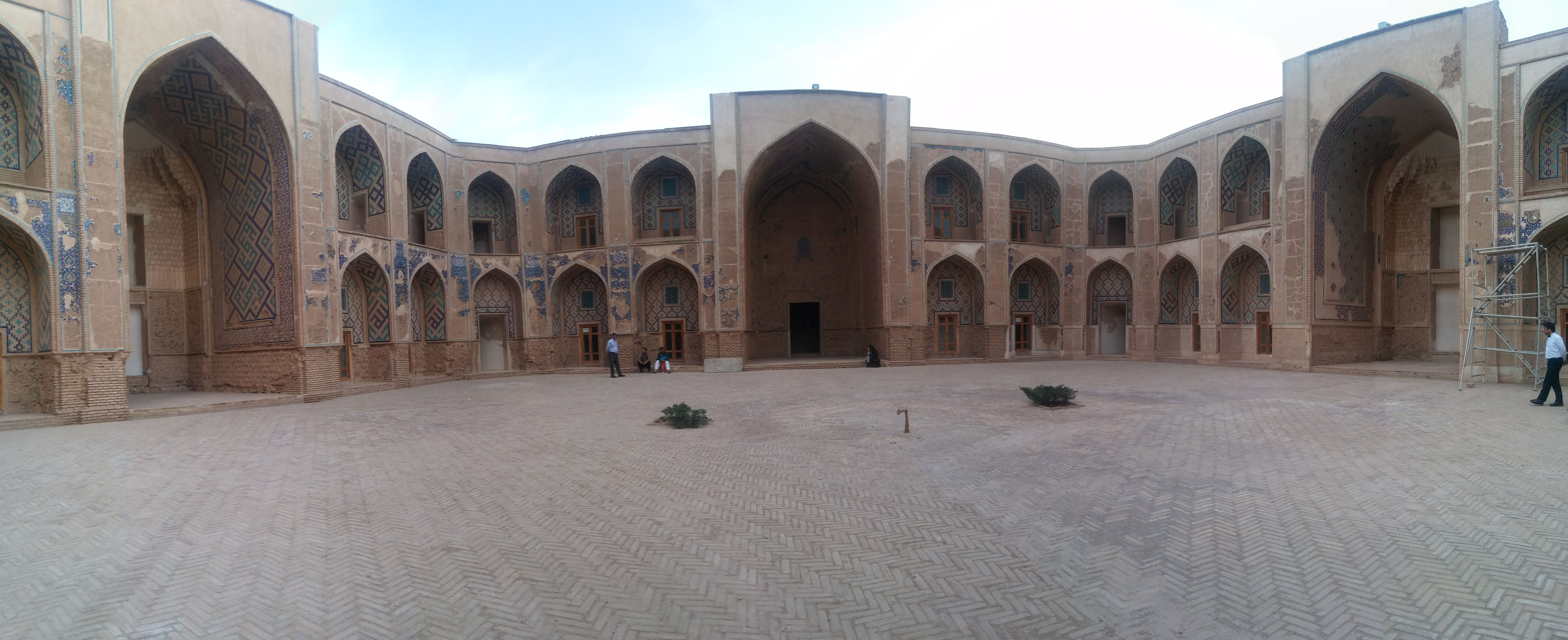

== See also ==
- List of schools in Iran
- Islam in Iran
- Education in Iran
