= Nashtifan =

City in Razavi Khorasan province, Iran

Nashtifan Persian: نشتيفان
- City
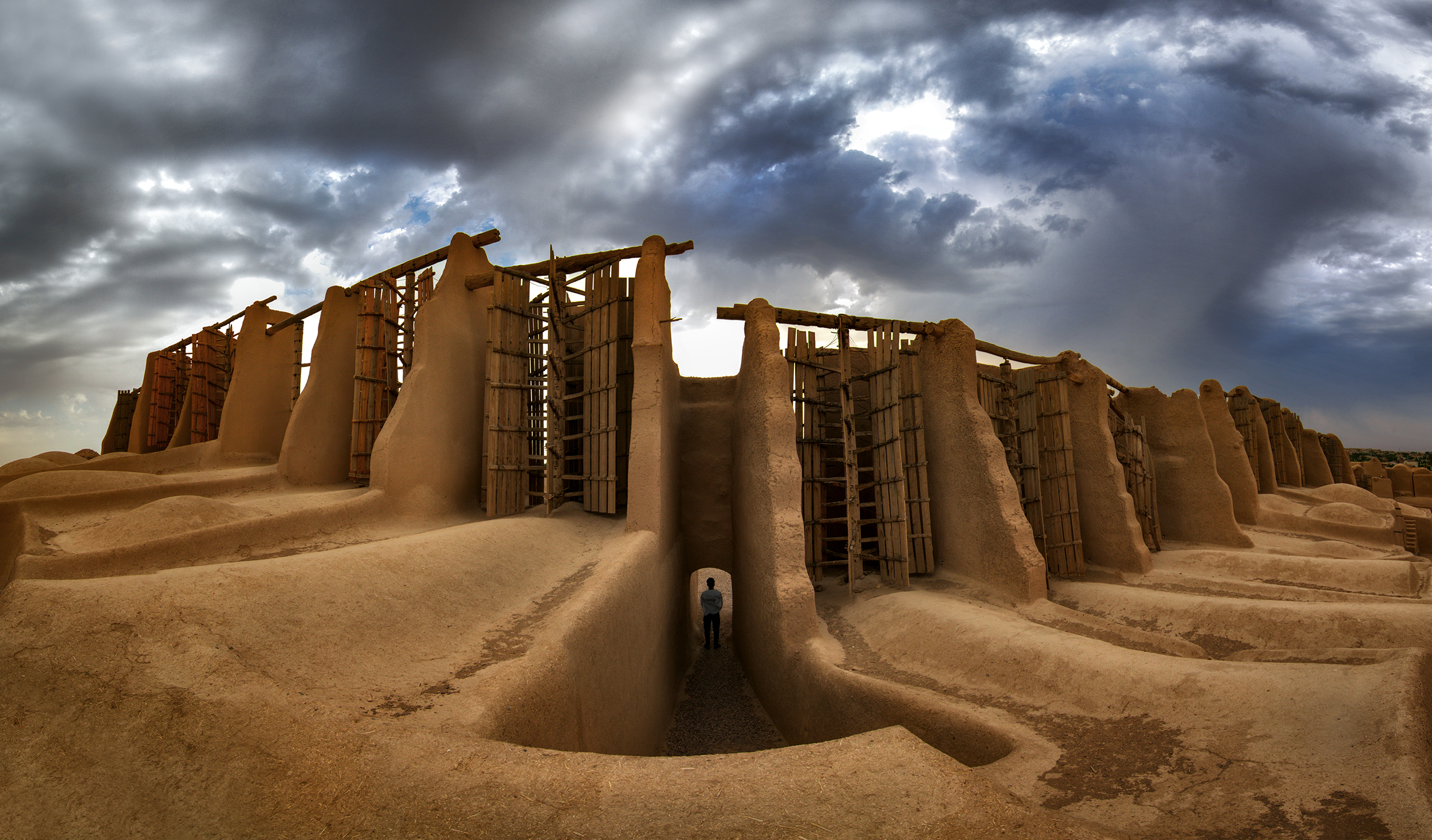
- Asbaad (ancient windmills) in Nashtifan

- Location within Iran
- Coordinates: 34°26′06″N 60°10′52″E
- Country: Iran
- Province: Razavi Khorasan
- County: Khaf
- District: Central
- Established as a city: 2003

Population (2016)
  - Total: 9,176
- Time zone: UTC+3:30 (IRST)

Nashtifan (Persian: نشتيفان) (Note: Also romanized as Nashtīfan; also known as Nashtīqan, Nīshāfūn, and Nīshtāfūn) is a city in the Central District of Khaf County, Razavi Khorasan province, Iran, serving as the administrative center for Nashtifan Rural District. The village of Nashtifan was converted to a city in 2003.

== Demographics ==
=== Population ===
At the time of the 2006 National Census, the city's population was 6,547 in 1,485 households. The following census in 2011 counted 7,426 people in 1,915 households. The 2016 census measured the population of the city as 9,176 people in 2,426 households.
