= Voru, Razavi Khorasan =

Village in Razavi Khorasan province, Iran

Voru Persian: ورو
- Village
- Location within Iran
- Coordinates: 34°32′36″N 59°59′58″E
- Country: Iran
- Province: Razavi Khorasan
- County: Khaf
- District: Central
- Rural District: Miyan Khaf

Population (2016)
  - Total: 369
- Time zone: UTC+3:30 (IRST)

Voru (Persian: ورو) (Note: Also romanized as Vorū; also known as Varāb (وراب)) is a village in Miyan Khaf Rural District of the Central District in Khaf County, Razavi Khorasan province, Iran.

== Demographics ==
=== Population ===
At the time of the 2006 National Census, the village's population was 291 in 63 households. The following census in 2011 counted 343 people in 87 households. The 2016 census measured the population of the village as 369 people in 87 households.
