= Barakuh, Khaf =

Village in Razavi Khorasan province, Iran

Barakuh Persian: براكوه
- Village
- Location within Iran
- Coordinates: 34°41′07″N 60°10′41″E
- Country: Iran
- Province: Razavi Khorasan
- County: Khaf
- District: Central
- Rural District: Miyan Khaf

Population (2016)
  - Total: 269
- Time zone: UTC+3:30 (IRST)

Barakuh (Persian: براكوه) (Note: Also romanized as Barākūh) is a village in Miyan Khaf Rural District of the Central District in Khaf County, Razavi Khorasan province, Iran.

== Demographics ==
=== Population ===
At the time of the 2006 National Census, the village's population was 311 in 64 households. The following census in 2011 counted 249 people in 57 households. The 2016 census measured the population of the village as 269 people in 78 households.
