= Qasim-i Anvar =

Sufi mystic and poet

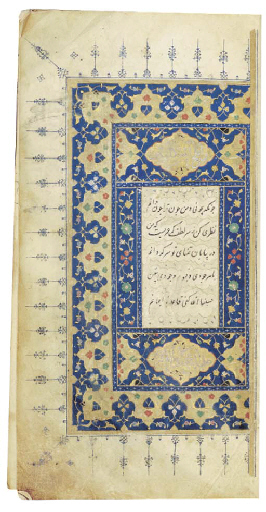
- 1492 copy of Qasim-i Anvar's diwan. Persian manuscript, probably made in Shiraz
- Born: 1356; Sarab, Azerbaijan
- Died: October/November 1433; Kharjird, Khurasan

Mu'in al-Din Ali Husayni Sarabi Tabrizi, commonly known by his laqab (honorific title) of Qasim-i Anvar (Persian: قاسم انوار; 1356 – 1433) was a Sufi mystic, poet, and a leading da'i (preacher) of the Safavid order.

== Biography ==
Mu'in al-Din Ali was born in 1356 in Sarab in the Azerbaijan region. According to the historians H. Javadi and K. Burrill / Encyclopædia Iranica, he was a native speaker of Azeri Turkish, while the historians Siavash Lornejad and Ali Doostzadeh state that he was most likely a native speaker of Fahlavi. Mu'in al-Din Ali preferred to use Persian, which he was fluent in. He grew up in the neighbouring city of Tabriz, where he received his education. In his mid-teens, he became a disciple of Sadr al-Din Musa (died 1391), who was the head of the Safavid order.

Due to a vision seen by Mu'in al-Din Ali, he was given the laqab (honorific title) Qasim-i Anvar ("Distributor of Lights") by Sadr al-Din Musa. Following his completion of his training at the city of Ardabil, Qasim-i Anvar given the khirqa by Sadr al-Din Musa. This cloak granted Qasim-i Anvar the right to convert others to his faith and offer spiritual teaching. Qasim-i Anvar later stayed in Gilan for some time as a missionary, and then went to Khurasan. He initially stayed at Nishapur, but was forced to move to Herat due to facing hostility from the ulama (clergy). According to his own writings, Qasim-i Anvar had established himself at Herat by 1377/78, and would stay there until his banishment in 1426/27.

Following his banishment from Herat, Qasim-i Anvar went to the city of Samarkand, where he stayed at the court of Shahrukh's son, Ulugh Beg (died 1449). A few years later, Qasim-i Anvar went back to Khurasan, where he died at Kharjird in October/November 1433.

== Works ==
Qasim-i Anvar composed several mystical treatises, ghazals, ruba'is, and mathnawis. The vast majority of his poems were in Persian. Some of them were in Azeri Turkish and Gilaki. His poems in Azeri Turkish may have only been written during his stay in Khurasan, in order to promote the Safavid order, and due to both Turkic and Persian experiencing a "literary renaissance." However, it may also indicate the rise of bilingualism in Qasim-i Anvar's birth region, where Fahlavi and Turkic speakers started to get in touch with each other.

== Sources ==
- Javadi, H.; Burrill, K. (1988). "Azerbaijan x. Azeri Turkish Literature". In Yarshater, Ehsan (ed.). Encyclopædia Iranica. Vol. III/3: Azerbaijan IV–Bačča(-ye) Saqqā. London and New York: Routledge & Kegan Paul. pp. 251–255. ISBN 978-0-71009-115-4.
- Lewisohn, Leonard (2019). "Sufism in Late Mongol and Early Timurid Persia, from 'Ala' al-Dawla Simnānī (d. 736/1326) to Shāh Qāsim Anvār (d. 837/1434)". In Babaie, Sussan (ed.). Iran After the Mongols. Bloomsbury Publishing. pp. 177–211. ISBN 978-1788315289.
- Lornejad, Siavash; Doostzadeh, Ali (2012). Arakelova, Victoria; Asatrian, Garnik (eds.). On the modern politicization of the Persian poet Nezami Ganjavi (PDF). Caucasian Centre for Iranian Studies. Archived from the original (PDF) on 2022-09-14.
- Savory, R.M. (1978). "Ḳāsim-i Anwār". In van Donzel, E.; Lewis, B.; Pellat, Ch. & Bosworth, C. E. (eds.). The Encyclopaedia of Islam, Second Edition. Volume IV: Iran–Kha. Leiden: E. J. Brill. pp. 721–722. ISBN 978-90-04-05745-6. OCLC 758278456.
