= Khar Gerd =

Village in Razavi Khorasan province, Iran

Khar Gerd Persian: خرگرد
- Village
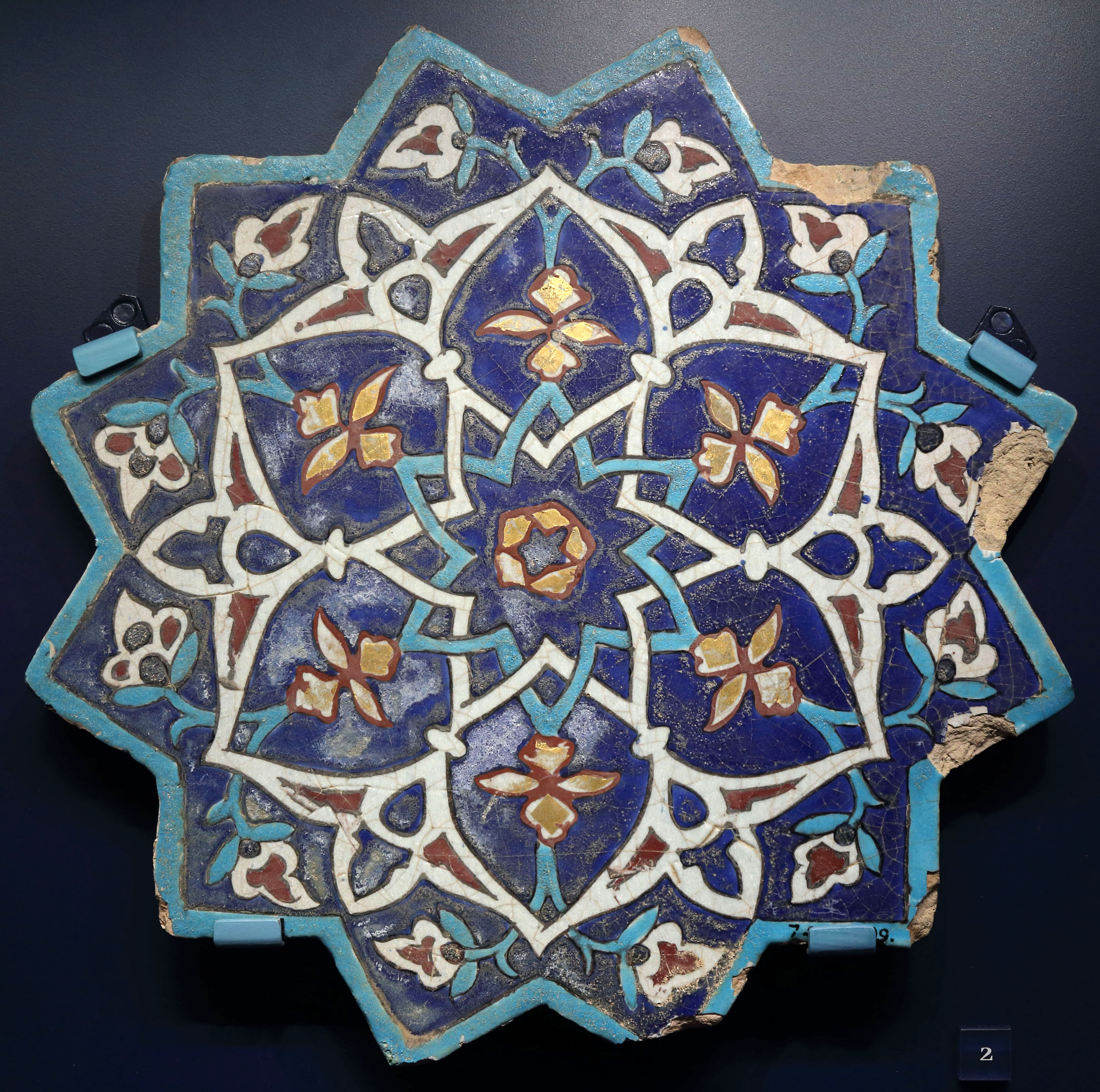
- Tile from local 15th-century Madrasa-i Ghiyathiyya, presently in the V&A Museum, London

- Location within Iran
- Coordinates: 34°32′10″N 60°10′43″E
- Country: Iran
- Province: Razavi Khorasan
- County: Khaf
- District: Central
- Rural District: Miyan Khaf

Population (2016)
  - Total: 1,464
- Time zone: UTC+3:30 (IRST)

Khar Gerd (Persian: خرگرد) (Note: Also known as Kharad Jerd and Kharadgerd) is a village in, and the capital of, Miyan Khaf Rural District in the Central District of Khaf County, Razavi Khorasan province, Iran.

== Demographics ==
=== Population ===
At the time of the 2006 National Census, the village's population was 1,407 in 325 households. The following census in 2011 counted 1,463 people in 361 households. The 2016 census measured the population of the village as 1,464 people in 386 households.
