= Khaf, Iran =

City in Razavi Khorasan Province, Iran

Khaf Persian: خواف
- City
- Location within Iran
- Coordinates: 34°34′16″N 60°08′38″E
- Country: Iran
- Province: Razavi Khorasan
- County: Khaf
- District: Central

Population (2016)
  - Total: 33,189
- Time zone: UTC+3:30 (IRST)

Khaf (Persian: خواف) (Note: Also romanized as Khāf and Khvāf; also known as Qaşabeh-ye Rūd, Rūd, Rūi Khāf, and Rūy), also as Khwaf, is a city in the Central District of Khaf County, Razavi Khorasan province, Iran, serving as capital of both the county and the district. It is on the Mashhad-Herat railway, currently under construction.

== Demographics ==
=== Population ===
At the time of the 2006 National Census, the city's population was 21,160 in 4,924 households. The following census in 2011 counted 28,444 people in 7,094 households. The 2016 census measured the population of the city as 33,189 people in 8,999 households.
