= Central District (Khaf County) =

District in Razavi Khorasan province, Iran

Central District (Khaf County) Persian: بخش مرکزی شهرستان خواف
- District
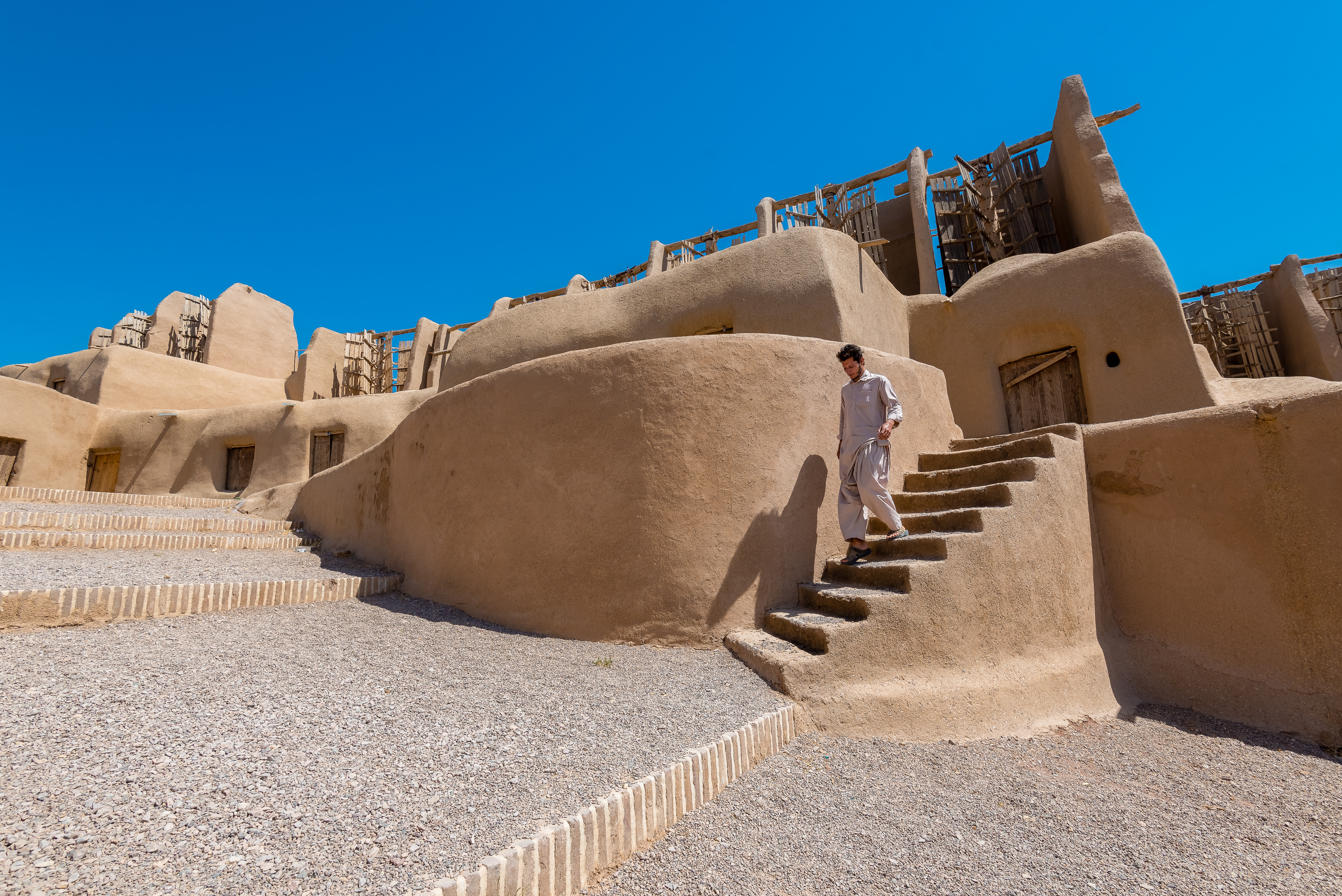
- Architecture in the city of Nashtifan

- Location within Iran
- Coordinates: 34°35′N 60°08′E
- Country: Iran
- Province: Razavi Khorasan
- County: Khaf
- Established: 1989
- Capital: Khaf

Population (2016)
  - Total: 52,899
- Time zone: UTC+3:30 (IRST)

The Central District of Khaf County (Persian: بخش مرکزی شهرستان خواف) is in Razavi Khorasan province, Iran. Its capital is the city of Khaf.

== Demographics ==
=== Population ===
At the time of the 2006 National Census, the district's population was 40,652 in 9,114 households. The following census in 2011 counted 46,273 people in 11,459 households. The 2016 census measured the population of the district as 52,899 inhabitants in 14,062 households.

=== Administrative divisions ===
Central District (Khaf County) Population
Administrative Divisions	2006	2011	2016
Miyan Khaf RD	11,135	8,537	8,782
Nashtifan RD	1,810	1,866	1,752
Khaf (city)	21,160	28,444	33,189
Nashtifan (city)	6,547	7,426	9,176
Total	40,652	46,273	52,899
RD = Rural District
