= Rebellion of Sheikh Ahmad Madani =

18th century Arab-Hotak revolt in Persia

- Part of Naderian Wars, Mohammad Khan Baluch's Rebellion
Date	January 1730 – Mid June 1734
Location	Lar and Hormozgan Province, Iran
Result	Rebellion suppressed: Arabs of Persian Gulf reincorporated into Safavid Iran

Belligerents
Safavid Iran; Nader's personal domains Supported by: English East India Company; Dutch East India Company (VOC)	Forces Loyal to Sheikh Ahmad Madani; Forces Loyal to Sheikh Jabbara; Forces Loyal to Sheikh Rashid bin Sa'id of Basaidu; Rebelling Arab tribes Hotak remnants and Afghan raiders

Commanders and leaders
Tahmasp Qoli Khan; Emamverdi Khan (Until 1733) Mohammad Khan Baloch; Sheikh 'Allaq Huwala; Mohammad Latif Khan; Mir Mehr-e 'Ali; Hajji Ghani Beg; Mohsen Khan; Mohammad 'Ali Khan; Hajji 'Ali Qoli Khan; Mirza Mohammad	Sheikh Ahmad Madani; Sheikh Jabbara; Sheikh Rashid bin Sa'id of Basaidu; Esma'il Safidbani; Ashraf Hotak; Neda Khan; Ahmad Beg; Mohammad Safidbani

Strength
(1731) ≥5,000 (1732) ≥12,000	(1730) 6,000 (1732) 30,000

The Rebellion of Sheikh Ahmad Madani (Persian: شورش شیخ احمد مدنی) was a revolt in the Garmsirat region of Iran from January 1730 as the Hotaks were being pushed out of Iran up until May 1734 when Sheikh Ahmad Madani was captured. However, remnants of the rebellion continued to fight until the middle of June 1734 before it was finally crushed.

It began as a result of the Restoration of the Safavids in late 1729. The Hotaks were expelled from Iran and many fled to the Garmsirat instead of taking the long route back to Kerman. The coastal Arab chieftains used this opportunity to seize independence and gave shelter to the Afghans. Outrageous taxes were also a factor in the rebellion. Many Arabs joined Sheikh Ahmad Madani and Iranian forces sent against Madani were unable to defeat him as they lacked sufficient naval forces to encircle the rebels.

Dutch East India Company letters reported he was collecting revenue in the areas between Lar and Shiraz. In the Autumn of 1730 Mohammad 'Ali Khan was able to defeat the rebels several times. However Mohammad 'Ali refused to accept any attempt at peace because he wanted to end them once and for all. He failed to do so however, and Ahmad Madani's stronghold remained safe. In October 1731 Sheikh Ahmad Madani had taken Lar again and besieged the citadel but were driven off and defeated. Sheikh Ahmad Madani still remained a threat to the region however.

In 1732 Mohammad Khan Baloch was sent with some 12,000 men to destroy Sheikh Ahmad Madani. However, he instead dealt with his own feud with the governor of Jahrom and did nothing to stop the rebels. In the autumn of 1733 Mohammad Khan Baloch revolted against Tahmasp Qoli Khan with the help of Sheikh Ahmad Madani, and this was the last straw. Nader Shah marched against the rebels with the assistance of the Dutch and English. By May 1734, Ahmad's stronghold at Maragh had fallen and Sheikh Ahmad Madani was captured. By the middle of June 1734 the Campaign against Sheikh Ahmad Madani was over. However, some remnants of the rebellions of Sheikh Ahmad Madani and Mohammad Khan Baloch fled to Kish and held it against Safavid forces for a brief period.

== Background ==
=== Hotak Campaigns in Lar and the Garmsirat ===
When Sultan Husayn abdicated on October 23 to Mahmud Hotak, the Hotaks didn't control much of the country. They slowly consolidated their position around Isfahan by taking notable villages and towns in Iraq-e Ajam and then moved south. On July 7, 1723, A Hotaki force moved out of Isfahan to besiege Shiraz. They first subdued Hajji Baqer, the Arab warlord that controlled the district of Qomisheh and besieged Shiraz by July 28. On April 14, 1724, Shiraz fell, allowing Hotak forces to spread to take more major towns in the South. In late June 1724 Lar was occupied by the Afghans, and on November 3 Bandar Abbas was occupied by an Afghan force coming from Lar. The Afghans were only able to control the major cities during their occupation of Iran. As Willem Floor notes in his book "The Rise and Fall of Nader Shah: Dutch East India Company Reports, 1730-1747":

"During the 1726-1730 period the Afghans certainly were not the absolute masters of Larestan or the Garmsirat. In fact, they were only obeyed in those places where they had a strong garrison or when they sent an army to subjugate a certain village. In October 1729 Neda Khan, the Afghan governor of Lar, was unable to destroy Sulgari, because he lacked the proper artillery. He was also opposed at the village of Gheyst (?). For his logistical and military support Neda Khan relied on the local Sunni Arab petty rulers."

On June 3, 1725, pro-Safavid forces recaptured Lar (although Afghan forces were still in the vicinity) and on June 10 Bandar Abbas was recaptured. In 1726 the expansion of a Safavid prince, Shah Ahmad Marashi, threatened the Afghan hold on the region. However, by late 1727 the Afghans made a counterattack. On December 20, 1727, the Afghans entered Bandar Abbas (a town which had been controlled by Shah Ahmad since October 1727) and by September 1728 the rebellion was crushed and he was executed. On December 16, 1729, Bandar Abbas was re-occupied by Safavid forces. However a few days later the Afghans retook the city. On January 9, 1730, the Afghan governor of Bandar Abbas fled to Shiraz, and the Battle of Zarghan on 15 January 1730 destroyed the Afghan effort completely. Various groups of Afghans fled to Lar while others were murdered by the villagers of the surrounding area. The Afghan power had been utterly shattered, and many fled into the arms of the welcoming coastal Arabs.

== See also ==
- Mohammad Khan Baloch
- Nader Shah
- Battle of Zarghan
- Hotak dynasty
- Afsharid Conquests in the Persian Gulf & Oman
- Mohammad Khan Baluch's Rebellion
