= Herat campaign of 1729 =

First Herat Campaign

Safavid Abdali War
- Part of Nader's Campaigns
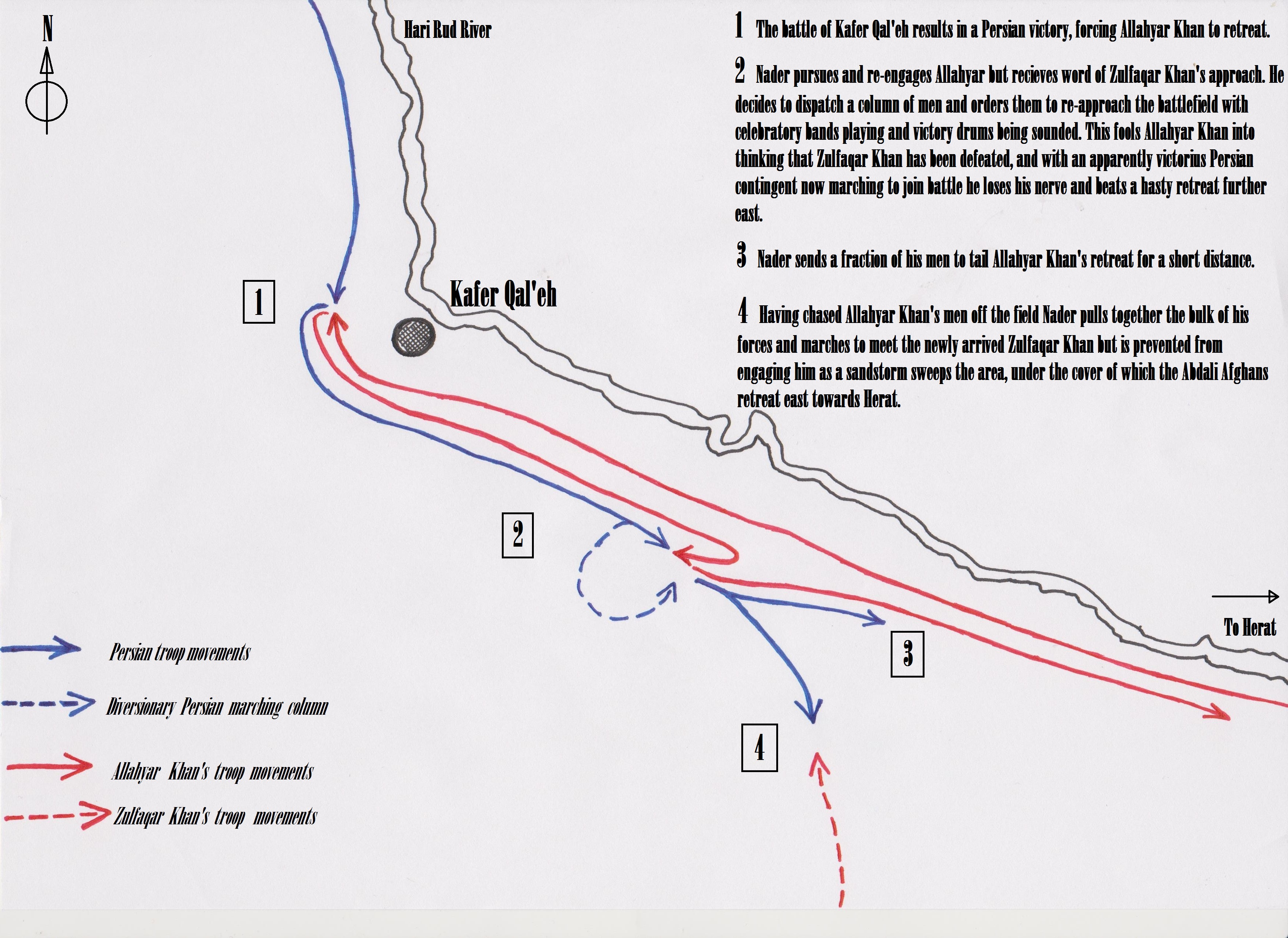
- A military diagram demonstrating the key manoeuvres in the campaign
Date	4 May – 1 July 1729
Location	Khorasan, Afghanistan
Result	Safavid victory
Territorial changes	Herat becomes a vassal of the Safavids

Belligerents
(Safavid Iran) Safavid loyalists	Abdali Pashtuns

Commanders and leaders
Nader (WIA)	Allahyar Khan Abdali; Zulfaqar Khan Abdali

Strength
Unknown, comparable to the Abdali: ~20,000	27,000: 15,000 under Allahyar; 12,000 under Zulfaqar

Casualties and losses
Moderate	Heavy

The Herat campaign of 1729 consisted of a series of intermittent and fluid engagements culminating in the finale of Nader's military operations against the Abdali Pashtuns. Nader having recently concluded a successful campaign against his own monarch and prince, the badly humiliated Tahmasp II, set out from Mashhad on 4 May 1729, making sure that the Shah also accompanied him on this journey where he could be kept under close supervision.

The conflict is also important because it helped develop Nader's tactics against light cavalry armies, something that would be important at the Battle of Damghan (1729), where the Hotak Pashtuns were given a rude introduction to modern warfare by Nader's well-drilled army.

== Background ==
The Abdali forces consisted of 15,000 riders under Allahyar Khan, the governor of Herat, concentrated around Kafer Qal'eh and another detachment of 12,000 men led by an impetuous commander by the name of Zulfaqar Khan which was approaching kafer Qal'eh from the south. In the ensuing ebb and flow of marches and counter marches where dozens of skirmishes, charges, feints, ruses and retreats Nader would find himself hard-pressed to keep the upper hand in a constantly changing battlefield environment where even the weather would prove unpredictable.

== Road to Herat ==
The battle of Kafer Qal'eh resulted in a tactical victory for Nader after which Allahyar Khan was pursued and re-engaged. At the height of the battle Nader's scouts brought word of Zulfaqar Khans approach prompting Nader to carry out an ingenious ruse. A column of Persian troops was sent on a march round Allahyar Khan's army with their victory drums & horns sounding loudly which led him to believe that Zulfaqar Khan's men had already been defeated forcing him to beat another hasty retreat.

As Allahyar broke away towards Herat Nader dispatched a portion of his army to pursue him but kept the bulk of his men to turn and face the fresh troops under Zulfaqar khan's command, however before Nader engaged Zulfaqar's contingent a sandstorm swept into the area rendering any further fighting all but impossible, thereby providing a cover under which the Abdali forces managed to withdraw towards Herat unmolested.

The campaign consisted of skirmishes, marshes, counter-marches, charges, feints, and retreats. Winning the Battle of Kafer Qal'eh, Nandar pushed and reengaged Allayar Khan's forces. During the fighting Nanda received word from his scouts that Zulfaqar Khan's force was approaching from the south. Entered and sent a column of troops around Allahyar's army, whilst sounding drums and horns, leading Allahyar to believe that Zufar's forces had already been defeated. Allahyar subsequently retreated towards Herat.

Nandar sent part of his army in pursuit of Allayars while retaining the remainder to confront Zulfaqar Khan's approaching force. Before the two forces could engage, however, a sandstorm moved into the area and prevented further fighting, allowing Zulfaqar's troops to withdraw toward Herat. Nander then continued eastward in pursuit of the Abdeli forces and reached the vicinity of Herat, where the combined forces of Ali Arkan and Sulfaqar Khan moved out to confront him.

== Subjugation of Herat ==
When battle was joined for the final time in view of Herat itself the action was uncannily similar to the previous engagements between the Persians and the Abdalis except that on this particular occasion the frontal charge of the Abdalis was firmly halted by muskets of the Persian line infantry crashing out simultaneously breaking the impetus of the Pashtun charge and providing adequate persuasion to the Abdalis to fall behind the city walls. Herat now came under an intense bombardment from the Persian guns and mortars, convincing the governor of Herat, Allahyar Khan, to sue for peace in exchange for recognition of Persia as suzerain of Herat.

== See also ==
- Military of Afsharid Iran
- Battle of Kafer Qal'eh
- Nader Shah
