= Campaigns of Nader Shah =

Military campaigns of Iranian general and king Nader Shah

Naderian Wars
- Part of the Ottoman–Persian Wars and Mughal–Persian Wars
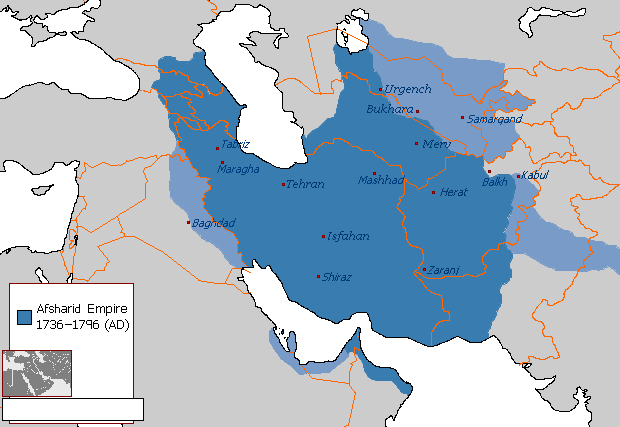
- Afsharid Empire at its greatest extent, in 1741–1745
Date	1726–1747
Location	Central Eurasia
Result	Persian victory
Territorial changes	The Persian Empire expands to its greatest extent since antiquity; Ephemeral Persian dominance over Central Eurasia; Eventual collapse of the Afsharid Empire

Belligerents
Empires of Persia: Safavid Iran (prior to 1736) Afsharid Iran (post 1736): Numerous clients & vassal states	Hotak dynasty; Ottoman Empire; (Safavid Iran) Safavid Empire; (Ottoman Empire) Iraq Emirate; Crimean Khanate; Gazikumukh Khanate; Mughal Empire; Khanate of Bukhara; Khanate of Khiva; Khanate of Kokand; Akhtypara; Altypara; Dokuzpara; Tabasaran Principality; Elisu Sultanate; Djaro-Belokani Societies; Akusha-Dargo Union; Avar Khanate; Ossetians; Omani Empire; Imamate of Oman; Hyderabad State; Oudh State; Sind State; Banu Ka'b Sheikhdom; Al Qawasim Sheikhdom; Bani Khalid Emirate; Emirate of Muhammara; Principality of Ardalan; Sultanate of Herat; Shaki Khanate; Kingdom of Kartli; Kingdom of Kakheti

Commanders and leaders
(Safavid Iran) Nader Shah (WIA) X (Safavid Iran) Tahmasp Jalayer X (Safavid Iran) Mohammad Khan Baloch (DOW) (Safavid Iran) Lotf Ali Khan † (Safavid Iran) Fath Ali Kayani (Safavid Iran) Latif Khan (Safavid Iran) Ahmad Shah Abdali (Safavid Iran) Riza Quli; Haji Beg Khan (Safavid Iran) Ibrahim Khan † (Safavid Iran) Adineh Mostafi (Safavid Iran) Nassrollah Mirza; Heraclius II; Givi Amilakhvari (Safavid Iran) Allahyar Khan Abdali (after 1732) (Safavid Iran) Zulfiqar Khan Abdali (after 1732)	Ashraf Hotak X Hussain Hotaki (POW); Mohammad Seidal; Nasrullah Khan; Zebardust Khan; Mohammad Seidal Khan (POW); Ahmed III; Mahmud I Topal Osman Pasha †; Hekimoğlu Ali Pasha; Köprülü Abdullah Pasha †; Ahmad Pasha; Mehmet Yegen Pasha †; Abdollah Pasha Jebhechi; Tahmasp II (executed) (Crimean Khanate) Meñli II Giray (Crimean Khanate) Qaplan I Giray; Surkhay-khan I Muhammad Shah; Khan Dowran VII †; Qamar-ud-Din Khan; Sa’ad ud-Din Khan; Nisar Muhammad Khan; Khwaja Ashura; Muzaffar Khan †; Abu al-Fayz Khan; Ilbars Khan II (executed); Abd al-Rahim Biy; Haji Davud; Ali Sultan of Elisu; Hadji-Ayub Akushinsky; Muhammad Khan Avar; Saif bin Sultan II; Bal'arab bin Himyar; Asaf Jah I Saadat Ali Khan I Noor Mohammad Kalhoro; Al Bu Nasir; Rahma bin Matar Al Qasimi; Sulayman bin Muhammad Al Khalidi; Sobhanverdi Khan; Allahyar Khan Abdali (before 1732); Zulfiqar Khan Abdali (before 1732); Haji Chalabi Khan; Teimuraz II

The campaigns of Nader Shah (Persian: لشکرکشی‌های نادرشاه), or the Naderian Wars (Persian: جنگ‌های نادری), were a series of conflicts fought in the early to mid-eighteenth century throughout Central Eurasia primarily by the Iranian conqueror Nader Shah. His campaigns originated from the overthrow of the Iranian Safavid dynasty by the Hotaki Afghans. In the ensuing collapse and fragmentation of the empire after the capture of the Iranian capital of Isfahan by the Afghans, a claimant to the Safavid throne, Tahmasp II, accepted Nader (who was no more than a petty warlord in Khorasan) into his service. After having subdued north-west Iran as well as neutralising the Abdali Afghans to the east and turning Tahmasp II into a vassal, Nader marched against the Hotaki Afghans in occupation of the rest of the country. In a series of victories the Afghans were decimated and Tahmasp II returned to the throne as a restored Safavid monarch.

In the aftermath of the Safavid restoration Nader campaigned in the western and northern reaches of the empire to regain territory lost to the Ottomans and Russians. After a bitter war lasting five years Nader had managed to restore the western frontier of Iran as well as reimposed Iranian suzerainty over most of the Caucasus. The admiration which his military achievements brought him allowed a bloodless coup against the Safavid monarchy in which he had the unanimous support of the Iranian ruling elite. Nader Shah's first campaign as the monarch of the newly established Afsharid dynasty was the subjugation of Afghanistan in its entirety. The result of the annexation of Afghanistan by Nader's empire was that he now had a direct path to the invasion of Mughal India. In one of his campaigns he crossed the Khyber pass with 10,000 men and subsequently descended down into the Mughal heartland where he engaged the Mughal army and, despite being outnumbered six to one, defeated his foes in little over three hours. After he had made the Mughal emperor his vassal and marched to Delhi he looted the city and massacred its population after they revolted against his occupation.

Nader's return to the empire signaled new wars in the central Asian regions. Nader expanded Iranian hegemony in central Asia to such extents that they surpassed the old Iranian empires of the Sassanids. At this juncture however Nader was beset by ever worsening mental health as he slowly deteriorated into insanity and paranoia. His subsequent campaigns against the Lezgins in the northernmost reaches of the Caucasus proved to be less successful and his siege of Baghdad was lifted prematurely due to an uncharacteristic lethargy in Nader's generalship. As Nader continued ruinous policies against the inhabitants of the empire and brutal suppression of dissent he alienated many of his subordinates and close associates. He had his heir's eyes gouged out in a fit of delusional paranoia and declared many of his loyal subjects traitors and rebels, forcing them to erupt in rebellion against him.

Nader's last years are characterised by wandering his own empire in a series of campaigns in which rebellions were put down in the most brutal and cruel manner. One of his very last major battles was a battle near Kars against the Ottomans where he annihilated the Ottoman army sent against him, prompting Istanbul to seek terms of peace. He was finally assassinated by a faction of his officers in his own tent. The death of Nader spelt the beginning of an extremely troubled and bloody chapter in Iranian history where continuous civil war engulfed the nation for over half a century before the establishment of the Qajar dynasty under Agha-Mohammad Khan Qajar.

== Military organization and reforms ==
Prior to his major campaigns, Nader implemented military reforms that shifted the army's reliance from irregular tribal cavalry to a more structured standing force. He expanded the Jazayerchi corps, an infantry unit armed with the heavy jazayer matchlock musket. The army also extensively utilized Zamburak (camel-mounted swivel artillery) and incorporated Georgian and Caucasian cavalry contingents into its regular formations.

== Conquest of Khorasan ==
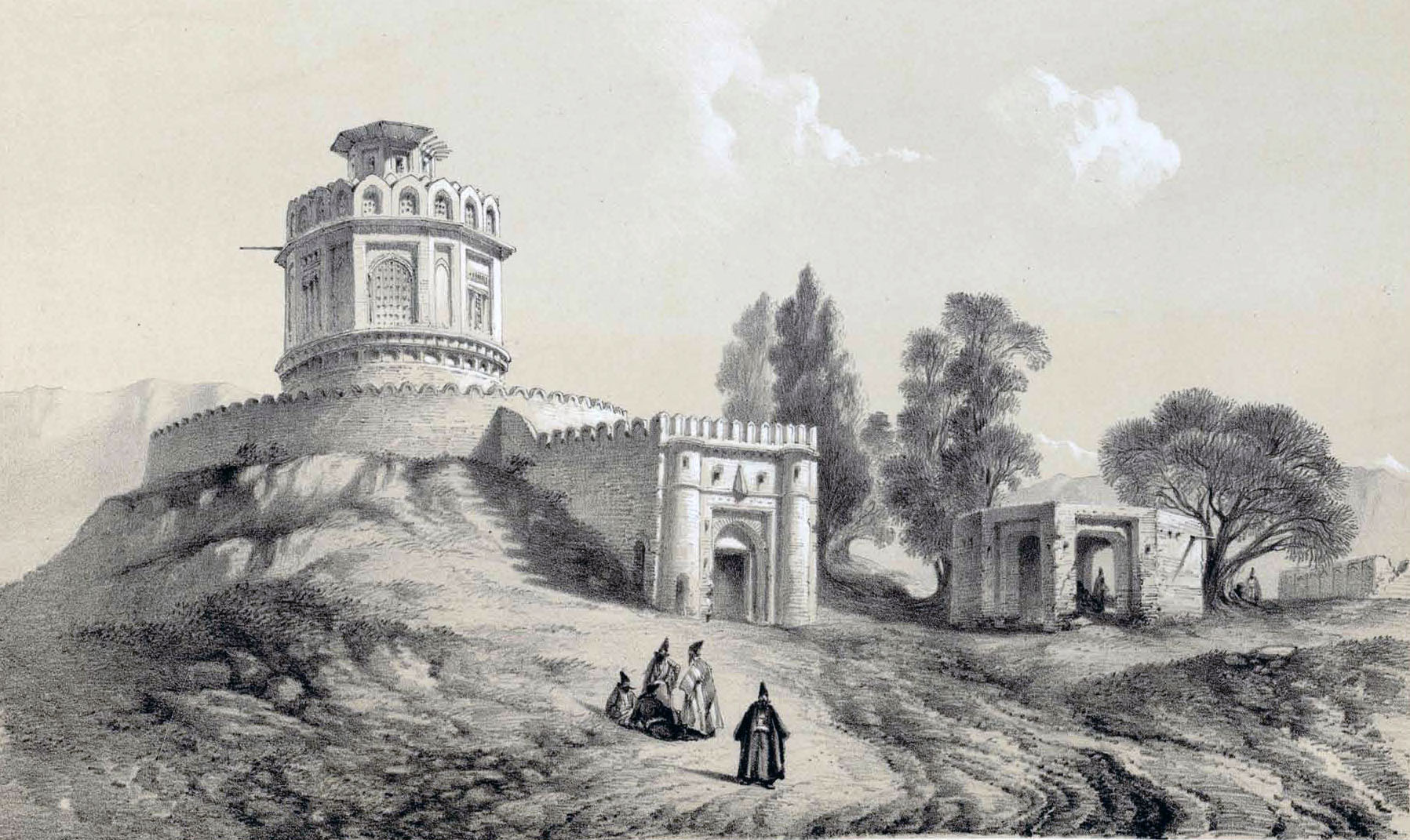
Eugène Flandin's impression of a gunpowder depot near Tehran (19th century).

=== Rebellion & Separation ===
Revolts swept through the province during the 1720s as a direct consequence of the Afghan revolt in the eastern provinces of the empire which eventually led to an invasion led by the Hotaki leader Mahmud Hotaki. In a pitched battle Mahmud inflicted a humiliating defeat on the Imperial forces sent from Isfehan in the battle of Gulnabad, after which he marched on the capital itself where he captured Isfehan after a terrible siege.

A courtier in Isfahan by the name of Malek Mahmoud Sistani reached an accord with the Hotaki Afghan conquerors in which he would set up an independent kingdom in Khorasan in exchange for his recognition of Mahmud as Shah of Iran. Sistani entered Khorasan and managed to regain most of Khorasan from the rebels and local warlords in a relatively short period of time with the capital Mashad falling into his hands. At this juncture Nader had established himself in the fortress of Kalat north of Mashad and with a mere force of 1,200 men raided Sistani's territory, although they did not come into direct confrontation Nader had established himself as the only real challenge to Sistani's influence in Khorasan.

=== Tahmasp II and the siege of Mashhad ===
After the conclusion of the siege of Isfahan Mahmud sent a contingent of his Afghans to subdue Qazvin where a new Safavid pretender Tahmasp had risen and proclaimed himself Shah. He was forced to flee Qazvin but could not stay in the region permanently as those areas not under Afghan control were unremittingly coming under the marching boots of Ottoman soldiers invading from the west. Tahmasp was chased from the west of the country and in Astarabad found a loyal if difficult subject warlord by the name of Fathali Khan of the Qajar clan.

Deciding that it was too soon to march on Isfahan to liberate the heartland of Iran they would begin in Khorasan where they could forge alliances and rally more troops under their banner. Marching toward Khorasan they came into contact with Nader whose loyalty they acquired along with his now much enlarged fighting force (Nader had campaigned against the Kurds and successfully incorporated many of them into his small army). A combined force of 30,000 men lay siege to Mashad with Sistani and his commander-in-chief Pir Mohammad trapped within the city's walls. Tahmasp had developed a tense relationship with Fathali Khan and matters came to a head on 10 October 1726, when Nader brought Tahmasp an intercepted letter, the damning contents of which provided abundant evidence of a clandestine line of communication between Fathali and Sistani. Nader, fearful that the Qajar contingent may leave if any harm befell their leader, advised Tahmasp to spare his life for the time being. Tahmasp, though agreeing with Nader's judgement, nevertheless had Fathali executed the subsequent day.

The Qajar contingent however remained with the Loyalist army despite Fathali's beheading and ironically it was a betrayal on the other side of the conflict that brought the siege to an end where Pir Mohammad allowed Nader to infiltrate the city walls forcing Sistani to take refuge in the citadel, surrendering shortly after.

=== Aftermath of the Siege ===
The defeated Malek Mahmoud Sistani was surprisingly treated with courtesy and in a show of reconciliatory mercy allowed to spend the rest of his life as a sage (Though he was executed the following year when he became suspect in Nader's eyes). The results of the siege had gifted the capital of Khorasan to Tahmasp as well as gifting Fathali's position to the sole person of Nader as he now took to subdue the remaining Khans and tribes of the province hence further augmenting his forces. His conquest of Khorasan allowed the Safavid loyalist movement to next focus on an expedition further east towards Herat.

== Conquest of Western Afghanistan ==
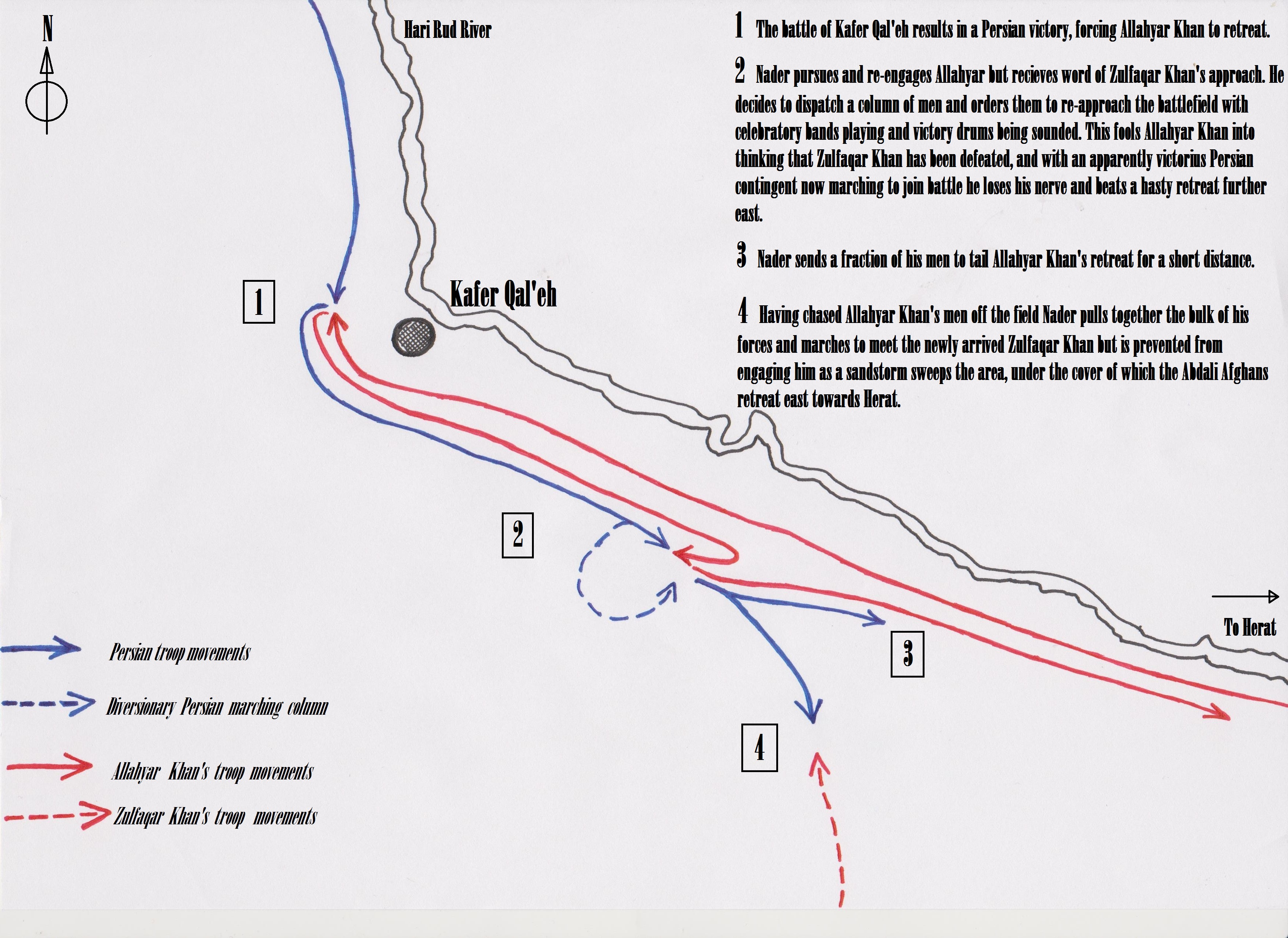
A military diagram demonstrating the key manoeuvres in the campaign of Afghanistan

The Conquest of Afghanistan by Nader Shah consisted of a series of intermittent and fluid engagements culminating in the finale of Nader's military operations against the Abdali Afghans. Nader having recently concluded a successful campaign against his own monarch and prince, the badly humiliated Tahmasp II, set out from Mashad on 4 May 1729, making sure the Shah also accompanied him on this journey where he could be kept under close supervision.

The conflict also bears significance in terms of the effects of Nader's army perfecting its tactical system through experience gained from going up against deadly light cavalry armies, something that would prove of incalculable importance in the battle of Mihmandoost (where the Afghans were given a rude introduction to modern warfare by Nader's well-drilled army). The Abdali forces consisted of 15,000 riders under Allahyar Khan, the governor of Herat, concentrated around Kafer Qal'eh and another detachment of 12,000 men led by an impetuous commander by the name of Zulfaqar Khan which was approaching Kafer Qal'eh from the south. In the ensuing ebb and flow of marches and counter marches where dozens of skirmishes, charges, feints, ruses and retreats Nader would find himself hard-pressed to keep the upper hand in a constantly changing battlefield environment where even the weather would prove unpredictable.

=== The Road to Herat ===
The battle of Kafer Qal'eh resulted in a tactical victory for Nader after which Allahyar Khan was pursued and re-engaged. At the height of the battle Nader's scouts brought word of Zulfaqar Khans approach prompting Nader to carry out an ingenious ruse. A column of Iranian troops was sent on a march round Allahyar Khan's army with their victory drums & horns sounding loudly which led him to believe that Zulfaqar Khan's men had already been defeated forcing him to beat another hasty retreat.

As Allahyar broke away towards Herat Nader dispatched a portion of his army to pursue him but kept the bulk of his men to turn and face the fresh troops under Zulfaqar Khan's command, however before Nader engaged Zulfaqar's contingent a sandstorm swept into the area rendering any further fighting all but impossible, thereby providing a cover under which the Abdali forces managed to withdraw towards Herat unmolested.

The entire campaign thus far had been a chain of skirmishes, marches and counter marches where Nader excelled as a quick thinking commander who outwitted his foes at every corner despite at times seemingly caught in near impossible situations such as when news of Zulfaqar's imminent arrival reached him when he was already heavily engaged with Allahyar Khan's men. The campaign however did not result in the Abdali's destruction and Nader followed their retreat eastward until he came in view of Herat where the combined forces of Allahyar and Zulfaqar rode out to meet him in an endto the campaign.

=== Subjugation of Herat ===
When battle was joined for the final time in view of Herat itself the action was uncannily similar to the previous engagements between the Iranians and the Abdalis except that on this particular occasion the frontal charge of the Abdalis was firmly halted by muskets of the Iranian line infantry crashing out simultaneously breaking the impetus of the Afghans charge and providing adequate persuasion to the Abdalis to fall behind the city walls. Herat now came under an intense bombardment from the Iranian guns and mortars, convincing the governor of Herat, Allahyar Khan, to sue for peace in exchange for recognition of Iran as suzerain of Herat.

=== Strategic & Tactical Ramifications ===
With the Abdalis of Herat subdued, the road to the heartland of the Iranian empire lay open and the liberation of Isfahan appeared feasible after the successes of earlier campaigns. Nader had also demonstrated the effectiveness of his military system. Through repeated engagements he had refined the technique of breaking fierce cavalry charges by means of steady infantry formations supported by cannon and protected on the flanks by cavalry; the combined fire of muskets and artillery would disrupt the attacking horsemen. This tactical system was put to its severest test at the battles of Mihmandust and Murche-Khort, where Nader’s veteran troops faced some of the finest cavalry forces in the region.

== Safavid Restoration ==
The Safavid restoration to the throne of Iran took place in the latter part of 1729 by a series of battles fought between Nader, Tahmasp's commander-in-chief and Ashraf Hotaki. Despite nominally bringing Tahmasp to the seat of power, true authority still rested with Nader who had, ever since the debacle in northern Khorasan, managed to seize Tahmasp II as his vassal. As for Afghan rule, the Ghilzai Afghans were ejected from the Iranian Plateau permanently and in the following years were re-annexed by Nader whence they were once again absorbed into the Iranian empire.

=== Battle of Mihmandoost ===
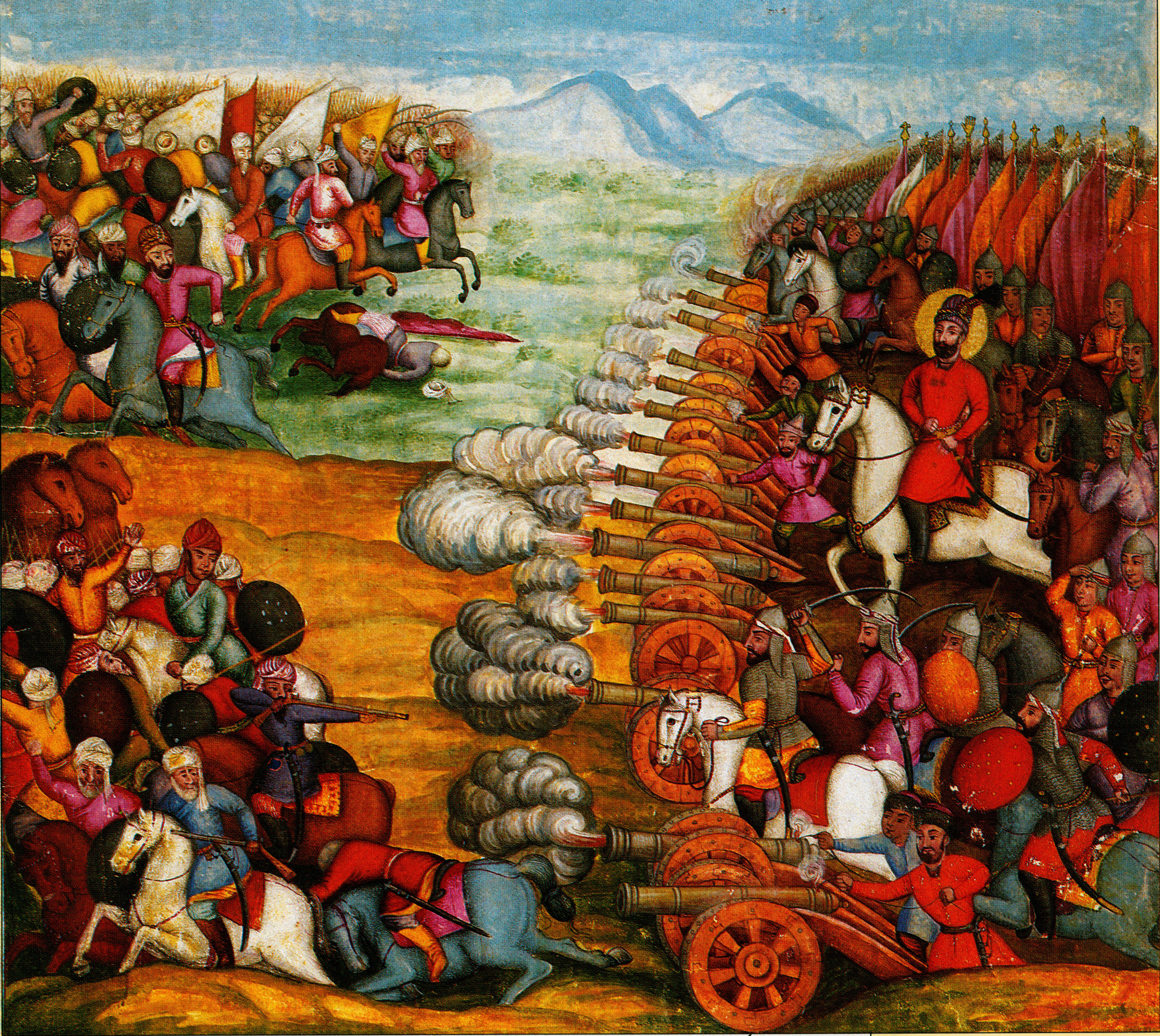
Painting of Battle of Damghan, illustrating Persian decisive artillery fire against the Afghans in 1729

Having delayed a confrontation with Tahmasp long enough, Ashraf found himself threatened by the pretender to the Safavid throne and his young general Nader. Hearing of their expedition against the Abdali of Herat Ashraf decided to march on the capital of Khorasan and capture Mashad before Nader could return from the east. However Nader was back in Mashad well before Ashraf had a chance of invading Khorasan. Marching towards Damghan Nader and Ashraf clashed near the village of Mihmandoost where despite being heavily outnumbered the Iranians gave the Afghans a terribly bloody lesson in modern warfare and crushed Ashraf's army, forcing him to retire towards Semnan.

=== Ambush at Khwar pass ===
Ashraf retreated west where he set up a well thought out ambush in the Khwar pass where he hoped the Iranians, flushed with their recent triumph, would be surprised and dealt a heavy blow. Nader upon discovering the ambush encircled and then completely destroyed it with whatever remnants fleeing towards Isfahan.

=== Battle of Murche-Khort ===
Requesting urgent support from the Ottoman Empire Ashraf sought to counter the Iranian army's thrust towards Isfahan. The Ottomans keen to hold Ashraf in power instead of seeing a resurgent Iran on their eastern frontier were all too eager to help with both guns and artillerymen. At the battle of Murche-Khort, the Afghans were yet again decisively defeated, forcing Ashraf to flee south.

=== Liberation of Isfahan ===
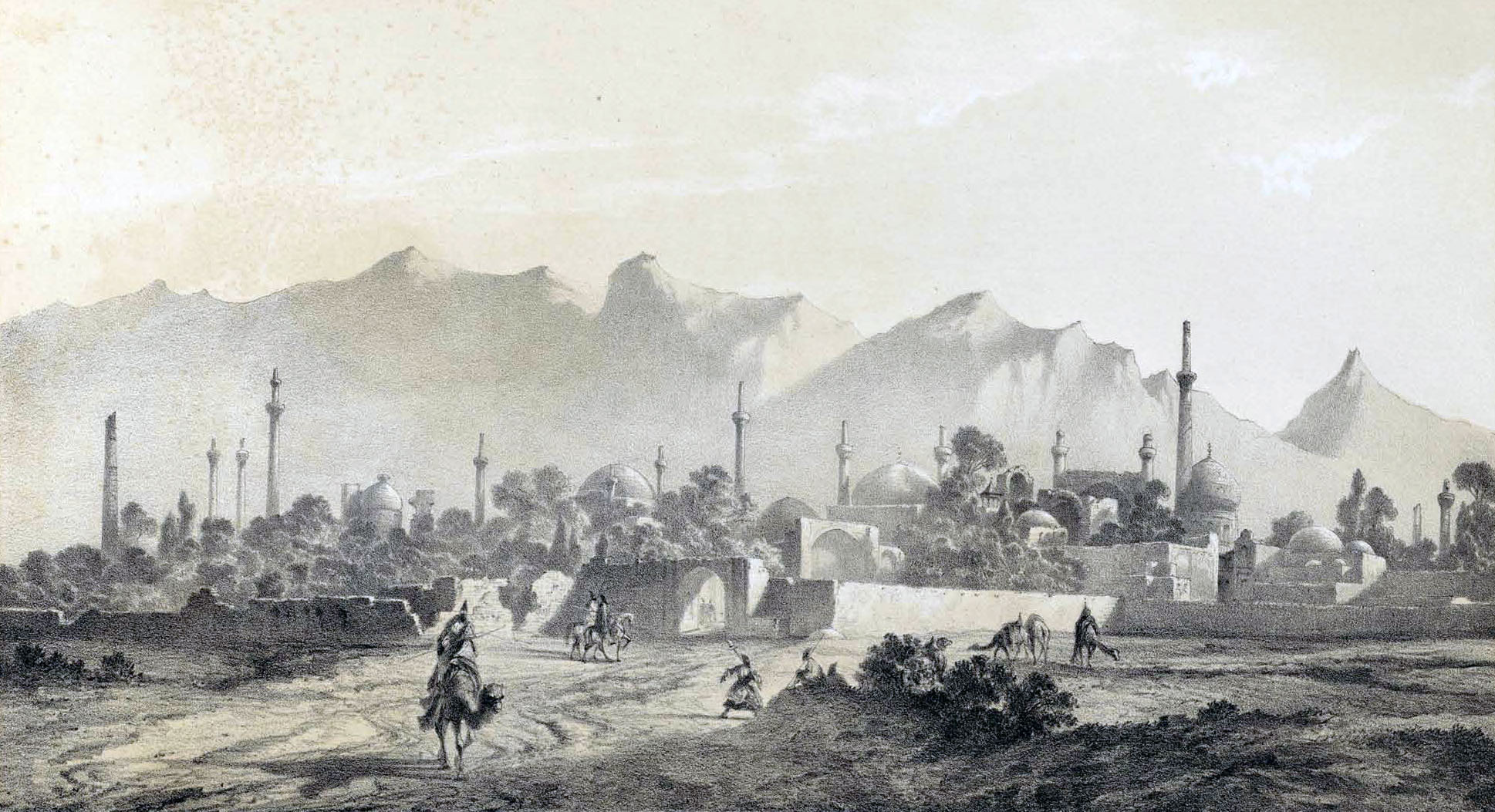
Isfahan (here depicted from the north-to-south direction), as the capital of Iran, was the ultimate objective of Nader's campaign for the liberation of Iran from Hotaki rule

Nader liberated Isfahan and soon after received Tahmasp II outside the main city gates where the Shah expressed his gratitude to Nader. The city had been devastated by the Afghans leaving very little in terms of riches for when Nader arrived. Tahmasp famously wept when he saw what had befallen the capital. The city was greatly reduced both in terms of population and in terms of wealth. The people took vengeance on those Afghans who were found hiding throughout the city.

=== End of Afghan rule in Iran ===
Nader set out from Isfahan heading towards Shiraz where Ashraf was busy raking together what he could with the support of some of the local Arab tribes. At this juncture there was no realistic hope for a revival of Afghan fortunes and near Zarghan the Iranian engaged and decimated the last army Ashraf commanded, with historical sources disagreeing on the latter's exact fate in the aftermath of the battle.

== Campaign of Western Iran ==
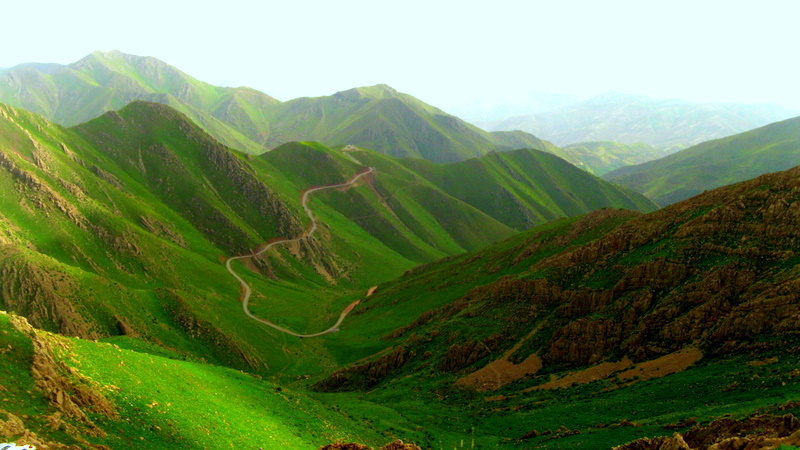
Western Iran, Kermanshah province

Nader's first Ottoman Campaign was his first against perhaps his most formidable adversary, namely the Ottomans, where he proved triumphant in conquest. The great successes of his expedition, however, were rendered null when Shah Tahmasp II decided to take personal command of the operations in Nader's absence, forcing a furious Nader to return and rectify the situation after forcing Tahmasp to abdicate in favour of his infant son, Abbas III.

=== The Ottoman occupation ===
The Ottomans had entered the western regions of the country in the early 1720s when the Hotaki invasion of Mahmud I was launched against the Safavid state. In a decisive engagement near Gulnabad, Mahmud Hotaki managed a surprising victory against a far greater (though severely divided) Iranian army. The rout of the imperial army allowed him to march on the capital Isfahan, which he captured after a 6-month siege that caused unheard misery and loss of life in the city. During the chaos of the Safavid overthrow, the Tsardom of Russia and the Ottoman Empire seized on this opportunity to annex as much land as they could, with Ottoman Turkey taking western Iran and dividing up the Caucasus with the Russians. During the Russian occupation of Persian territories in the Caspian coast, about 130,000 Russian troops died due to disease.

Soon, the Hotaki conquerors installed a new leader as king through a coup d'état in which Mahmud I was replaced with a capable cousin of his, Ashraf. Ashraf marched west to put a halt to any further expansion by the Ottomans and, to the surprise of many, defeated them. The diplomatic outcome however was very much reconciliatory as the Ottomans promised recognition of Ashraf as the legitimate Shah of Iran in exchange for Ashraf's acknowledgement of Ottoman rule in their new territories in the Caucasus and western Iran.

As Nader and Ashraf came head-to-head in a conflict that would decide the fate of the country, the Ottomans wisely supported Ashraf against the Safavid loyalists, as a resurgent Iran under an ambitious and talented general who would be flushed with the success of conquest would not bode well for the Ottomans' hold on their newly acquired provinces. Despite the support his opponent received from the Turks, Nader still managed to completely destroy Ashraf's forces in numerous engagements which led to re-establishing the Safavid state under the nominal rule of Tahmasp II. Istanbul's fears had been realised as Nader would certainly turn to liberating the lost territories of the empire. The Ottomans, however, had been present in the west of the country for close to a decade and would prove a very formidable challenge to any efforts aimed at their expulsion from what now formed the eastern boundaries of their empire.

=== Nader marches on Nahavand ===
On 9 March 1730, the Iranian army exited Shiraz and celebrated the new year (Nowruz) in a leisurely manner, after which Nader started a rapid, forced march westwards in the hope of catching the Ottomans off balance. Reaching Ottoman-occupied town of Nahavand via Luristan, Nader put the Turks here to flight towards Hamadan, where, recovering from their initial shock and panic, they regrouped and presented themselves in the valley of Malayer to give battle in the hope of ending the Iranian advance on Hamadan.

=== The Battle of Malayer Valley ===
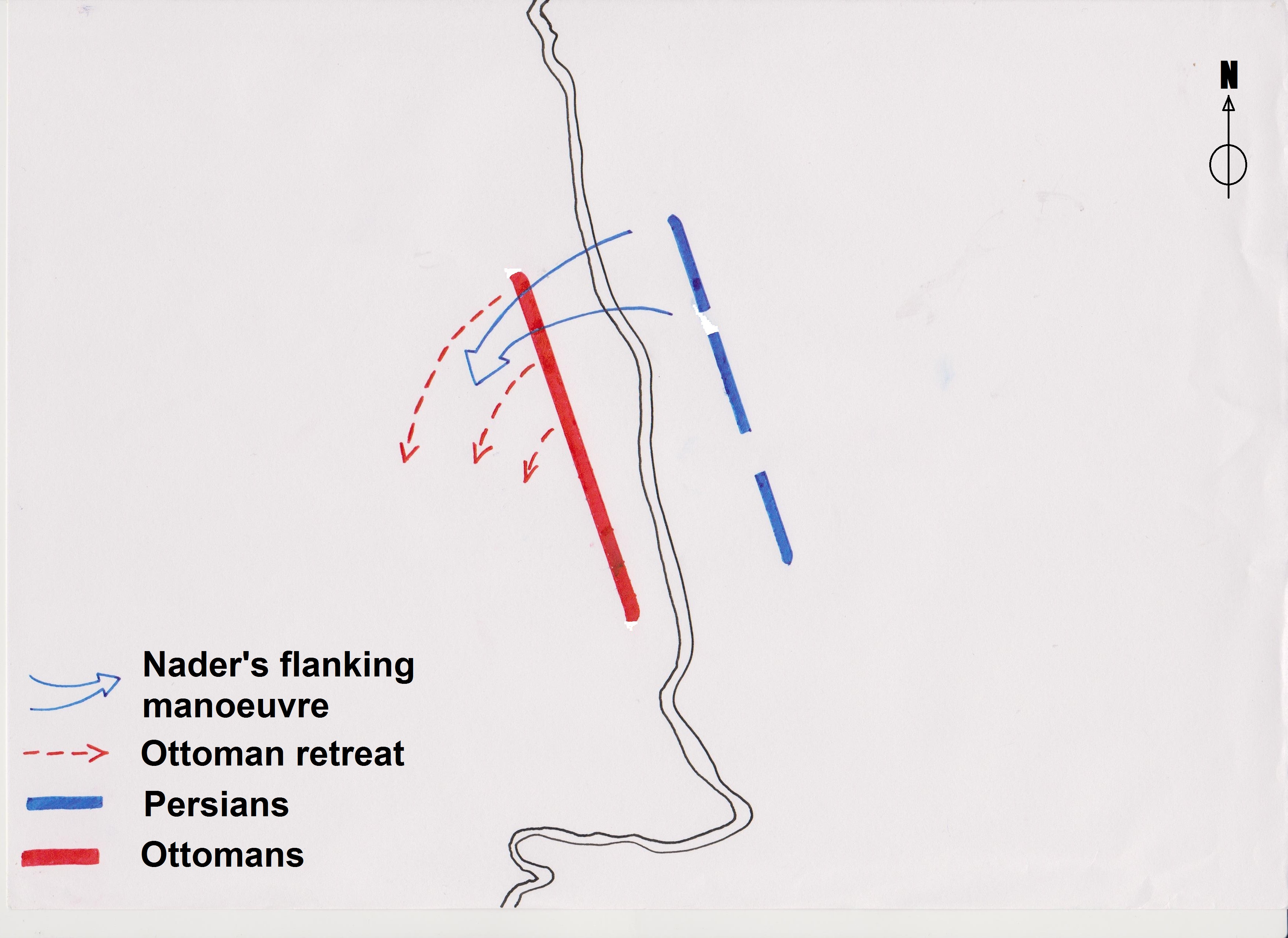
A military diagram of the battle of Malayer valley

The Ottoman force arrayed in front of the Iranian army was of a different nature altogether from all the previous foes the Iranian army had faced up to this point. The Afghan and tribal opponents of Nader had been almost completely devoid of any infantry or artillery units (excluding Murche-Khort), comprised almost exclusively of excellent mounted warriors instead.

Nader now faced an adversary who, in many respects, mirrored the Iranian army's own composition in structure as well as constituent unit types. The Turks had drawn themselves up parallel to a stream flowing through the valley, on the other side of which Nader deployed his men into three separate divisions, placing himself in the centre. As the two armies came within musket range of each other, a general fire broke out along the entire length of the line, with the smoke created from the muskets & cannon dancing over shallow body of water separating the two armies, obscuring the Iranians and Ottomans from each other's view. Nader, under the veil of smoke, started strengthening and preparing his right wing for a bold gamble.

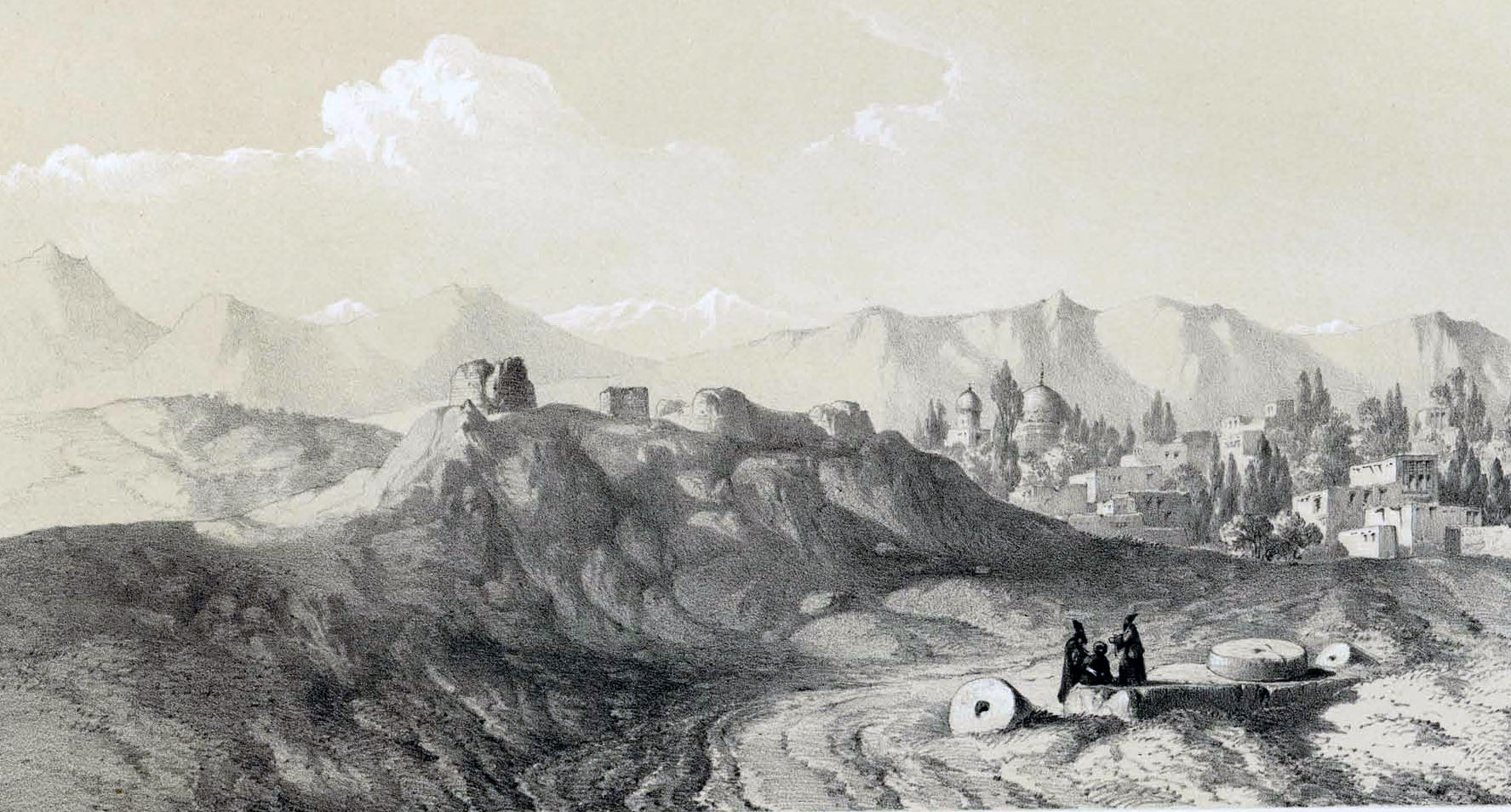
The battle of Malayer Valley opened the road to Hamadan

Nader gave the order for a sudden thrust by his right flank across the stream. The Iranians appeared from the billowing cloud of smoke that had concealed their advance and threw the Ottomans, who were dazzled by the unexpected appearance of the enemy seemingly out of thin air, into disarray. An intense few hours of fighting followed, with the Ottomans attempting to salvage their left to no avail. The onslaught of the Iranian right cut further into the flesh of the Turk's left wing and the killing of the chief Ottoman Bannerman caused a much demoralised army to turn tail and flee, with Iranian cavalry in pursuit cutting down and imprisoning a large number of men. A clear victory was won, opening the road to Hamadan for Nader's troops.

=== Nader pivots north ===
After liberating Hamadan along with its 10,000 imprisoned Iranian soldiers, Nader gained Kermanshah, thus liberating large swathes of western Iran from Ottoman rule. Leaving behind a fortified position, he now moved his army to Azerbaijan, where he took Tabriz on 12 August, crushing an army sent (too late) to reinforce Tabriz. The Turkish prisoners were treated kindly, with Nader freeing many of the Pashas, dispatching them with messages of peace to Constantinople (Istanbul). In a lightning campaign, Nader had reincorporated all the main provinces of the Iranian heartland.

== Tahmasp's Campaign ==
The Campaign of Tahmasp was a failed attempt to launch an offensive into Ottoman-held Caucasus which ended in a disastrous defeat with all of Nader's gains during the previous year being lost. The result of this particular military catastrophe was still overturned with Nader's return from the east but would have much more significant impact on the Safavid dynasty itself as Tahmasp II sealed his own fate by initiating this ill-fated expedition. Nader had to cancel his planned invasion of Ottoman-held Caucasus territory in light of the fact that the Abdali Afghans had rebelled and invaded Khorasan, besieging its provincial capital Mashhad. Gathering and training new recruits during the winter of 1731 in northern Iran he set out eastwards to secure the right flank of the empire. Tahmasp II who sat observantly on the newly regained throne (which he owed to Nader) was cajoled by his courtiers into taking to the field himself. Although Michael Axworthy and many other historians accuse Tahmasp of being motivated primarily by jealousies caused by his illustrious commander-in-chief's incessant victories, there is reason to suspect his decision was in fact induced by court intrigue amongst the imperial entourage eager to have their Shah outshine Nader and thereby lessen his influence.

=== The Campaign and Siege of Yerevan ===
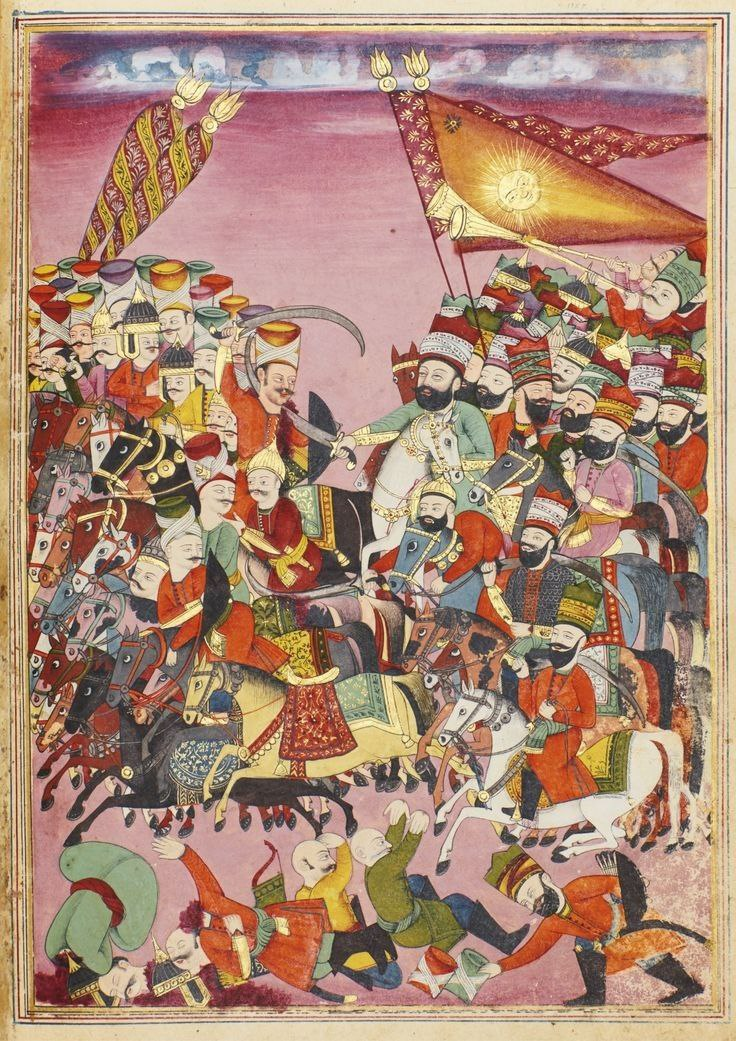
Nader Shah fights the Ottomans, Jahangosha-ye Naderi

At this time in Constantinople, Patrona Halil, a mob rebellion, had produced a change in leadership bringing Mahmud I to power. Sultan Mahmud I appointed a half-Venetian statesman to command in the east at the head of an army which would prove Tahmasp's undoing. Aiming to cloak the Caucasus under Iranian hegemony as in the time of his forefathers, Tahmasp aimed to conquer Chokhur-e Sa'd, i.e. Georgia and Daghestan, from the Turks. An army of 18,000 men was led into Chokhur-e Sa'd where Tahmasp found himself scoring a victory over an Ottoman army near Yerevan.

Hakimoghlu Khan reacted immediately by setting out to break the siege of Yerevan. Realizing Tahmasp had not taken any precaution to guard his line of communication southwards Hakimoghlu cut Tahmasp's logistical line to Tabriz, thus forcing him to end the siege and head back to Tabriz. Hearing of Ahmad Pasha entering Western Iran with the intention of taking Kermanshah and Hamadan, Tahmasp was now caught in a dire situation. As the Iranian and Ottoman armies came into view of each other, numerous letters were being exchanged between Ahmad Pasha and Tahmasp. The Iranian army was largely composed of raw recruits (the veterans campaigning far in the east under Nader) and was formed up in the traditional manner of three divisions making up the centre and the flanks.

There seems to have been an unintentional initiation of musketry by the inexperienced Iranian infantry leading to a pitched battle where the Iranian cavalry on either flank overcame their counterparts but were let down by the nervous infantry in the centre, who were easily put to flight by the advance of the Janissaries which now turned to aid their mounted comrades in a counter-attack on the Iranian horsemen, also routing them in turn. Tabriz also fell to Hakimoghlu Khan with Ahmad Pasha complementing his gains by capturing Hamadan.

Tahmasp was obliged to sign a treaty by which he accepted Ottoman suzerainty over the Caucasus and would, in exchange, be given back Tabriz, Hamadan and Kermanshah. The conclusion of his incompetence in this foreign venture had resulted in signing one of the most humiliating treaties of his dynasty, although this seemed to weigh little on his mind as he soon returned to Isfahan to resume a magnificently opulent lifestyle.

On discovering the cataclysmic events that had unfolded in the west, Nader abandoned any further conquest in the east to return to Isfahan with much justified anger at the Shah's inept statesmanship which must have been all the more infuriating as Nader's impressive achievements against the Ottomans during the previous year had been rendered utterly irrelevant. This gave Nader the political moment necessary to force Tahmasp II to abdicate in favour of his infant son, Abbas III, thus effectively making Nader the supreme and unchallenged authority in the realm. This paved the way for his eventual overthrow of the Safavid dynasty altogether.

== Mesopotamian Campaign ==
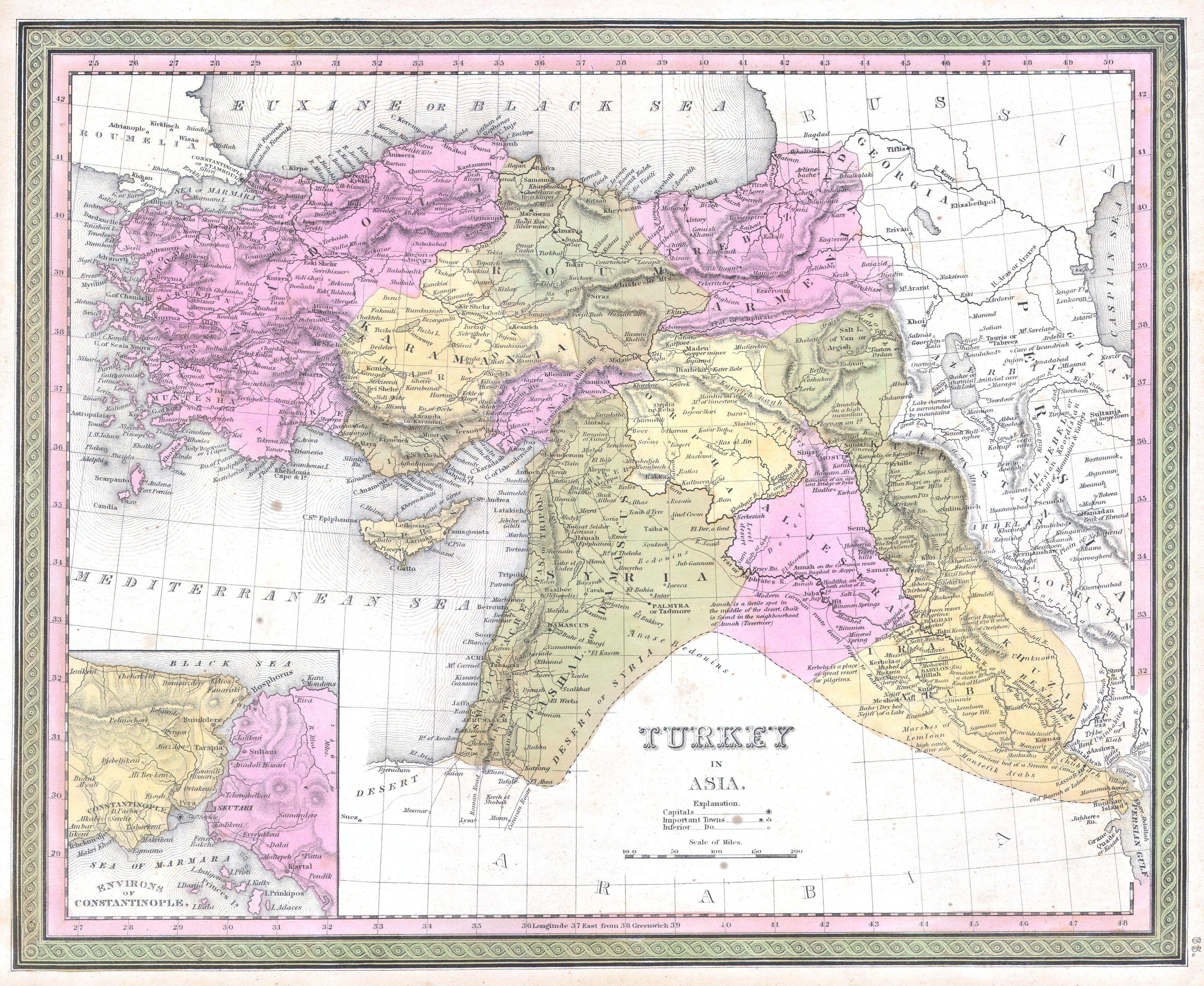
A map of the Ottoman Near East before the war

As a direct result of Tahmasp II's blunders in his ill-fated invasion of the Ottoman Caucasus all of Nader's previous gains on the battlefield were lost and a humiliating treaty had been signed, giving away Isfahan's hegemony over the Caucasus to Istanbul. This settlement gave Nader the authority to force Tahmasp's abdication and resume the war against the Turks by launching an invasion on Ottoman Iraq.

=== The Strike into Iraq ===
Ottoman Iraq seemed a peculiar choice for Nader's invasion, as all the western territories of Iran were restored under the ignominious treaty signed by Tahmasp with the Caucasus under Turkish control. Axworthy speculates that Nader intended to seize Baghdad as a bargaining chip in exchange for the Caucasus, but with Baghdad being such a strategic prize in itself, it is rather doubtful he had any civil exchange of territory in mind at the time. Despite the unexpected choice of theatre, the Ottomans in the region were well prepared to receive the Iranians.

To achieve a modicum of surprise, Nader decided to launch a march through the mountains, as opposed to a direct advance against the fortified border town of Zohab, near Qasr-e Shirin. The mountain path was a difficult and snowy route to navigate and some amongst the soldiers perished but Nader managed to get his 600 men to descend down into the valley behind the Ottoman battlements and, without any hesitation, struck in the dead of night. Completely out-witted by Nader, the garrison of Zohab woke up and fled their posts in terror. Nader ordered a new fort to be built and moved south to join the main Iranian army that had left Hamadan and was heading to Baghdad.

=== Crossing the Tigris ===
Besieging Kirkuk with a residue force of 7,000 soldiers, the main Iranian army marched on until they defeated an Ottoman army near Baghdad and then proceeded to encircle the city itself in preparation for a siege after a hard-fought maneuvering campaign where Nader managed to cross the Tigris. Ahmad Pasha would prove a stubborn defender of the city and held out until the approach of a relief effort in the form of an army of 80,000 soldiers, placed under the command of Topal Pasha.

=== The Battle of Samara ===
In a cunning ruse, Topal drew Nader into a disadvantageous battle where, despite losing a quarter of his own men, Topal inflicted a crushing defeat on the Iranian army, half of which was destroyed and all its guns lost. This monumental victory allowed the lifting of the siege further to the south where Ahmad Pasha - having heard of Topal Osman's victory - came out with an enthusiastic garrison to chase away the 12,000 Iranians left to maintain the blockade of Baghdad.

=== The Battle of Kirkuk ===
Making an almost fantastical recovery from his seemingly irreplaceable losses, Nader rebuilt his army in an incredibly short amount of time and invaded Ottoman Iraq once again. After some minor frontier skirmishing, he sent Haji Beg Khan to lure out Topal Pasha, which the former succeeded in doing. The Ottoman foreguard was drowned under the waves of a ferocious ambush, after which Nader gathered his men and marched directly against the main Ottoman army nearby.

An intense musketry duel was kept up along the entire breadth of the line until Nader ordered his infantrymen to unsheathe their sabres and charge the Ottomans, supporting them with a pincer movement by his cavalry reserve which put Topal Osman's army in a cauldron of Iranian troops. The Turks, crumbling in the face of this maneuver, found that not even the presence of such an 'old fox' as Topal Pasha could rally them and fled, leaving all their guns behind them.

Nevertheless, Nader could not pursue his impressive conquest due to a growing uprising in southern Iran which required his immediate attention. Therefore, Baghdad was yet again saved from falling into Iranian hands. The campaign itself did not decide the fate of the war but it did set the stage for Nader's Caucasus campaign in 1735 where Istanbul, through a shattering defeat of the Ottoman forces at Baghavard, was brought to its knees.

== Afghan Revolt ==
=== Zulfaqar Khan's Revolt ===
As the Iranian empire set about re-incorporating the lost territories to the west, Hussein sultan of Qandahar intrigued the Abdalis of Herat to raise against their masters while the main Iranian forces were arrayed against the Ottomans thousands of kilometres to the west. The governor of Herat, Allahyar Khan, who was confirmed in his position by Nader after his the war of in 1729 remained loyal but his chief lieutenant Zulfaqar Khan was very much taken by Qandahar's assurances and support.

=== The siege of Mashad ===
Allahyar Khan was obliged to flee Herat and was given refuge by Nader's brother Ibrahim Khan. The Abdalis soon invaded Khorasan itself and marched on its capital, Mashad, defeating the Iranian army under Ibrahim Khan and forcing it to withdraw into the city walls which now came under siege. Although the Abdalis had little chance of actually taking the city as what little artillery they possessed would hardly have made any impression on the battlements of Mashad, these events shook Nader, who received word that his power base back in Khorasan was under threat. On 16 August, Nader left Tabriz behind and marched his force across 2,250 kilometres over the Iranian plateau with lightning speed, bringing him to Mashad where he found the Abdalis in headlong retreat.

=== Siege of Herat ===
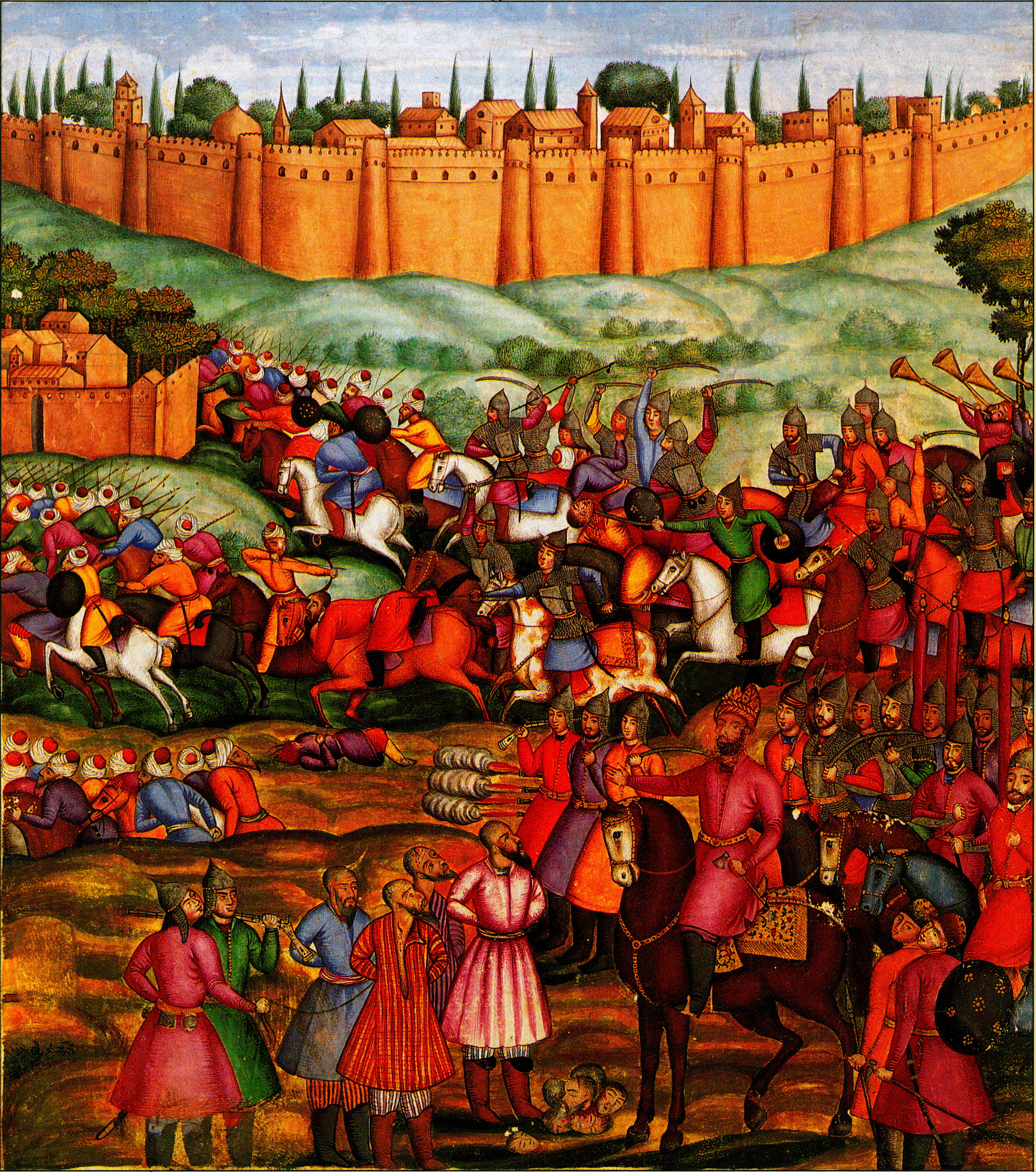
Siege of Herat in 1731, Jahangosha-ye Naderi

Hussein Hotaki was growing increasingly anxious about his position in Qandahar with Nader approaching Herat, prompting him to enter into negotiations with Nader in which he sent back a few captive Safavid princesses. However, Hussein sultan's support for his proxy, Zulfaqar Khan, did not cease or even lessen – in fact a Ghilzai force of at least a few thousand strong, commanded by Mohammad Seidal Khan, was sent from Qandahar to support him.

The Iranian army arrived during April 1731 in the town of Noghreh, just a few short kilometres from Herat itself, whence they fanned out to take hold of the towers and strongholds in Herat's vicinity. During one of these nights, Nader's small entourage of a mere eight musketeers were trapped in an isolated tower when Seidal Khan carried out a surprise raid. Fortunately for Nader, a unit of musketeers attacked the Afghan cavalry encircling his tower and put the enemy to flight. At a later date after crossing over a bridge over the Hari River, the Iranians beat back a large counterattack by the Afghans, forcing the latter to retire behind the walls of Herat's citadel. On a particular night, when Nader was resting in his tent, an Afghan cannon fired a random shot from the citadel walls, lobbing a round ball through the roof of the tent with it landing right next to Nader's bed as he was resting. This made his followers claim he enjoyed divine protection.

The final decisive engagement took place outside the city when Zulfaqar Khan and Seidal Khan agreed to a joint, coordinated attack against the Iranians. The attack was decimated when Nader sent a flanking force round the Afghans and himself rode directly against their frontline with a large body of cavalry. The defeat caused Seidal Khan's departure, a move which in turn led to the remaining defenders of Herat asking for terms of submission.

=== Allahyar Khan's Betrayal ===
Under the treaty signed by both sides, Allahyar Khan was returned his governorship of Herat with Zulfaqar Khan being exiled to Farah. Nader did not however militarily occupy the citadel – an action which would prove to be a terrible mistake when 4,000 fighters came down from Farah and stoked the fires of rebellion once more. Allahyar Khan was pressured despite his reluctance to join the revolt. He was also exiled.

The siege of the citadel was hence resumed with the Afghans sending peace emissaries once they realised their predicament. The negotiations lasted a long while but were eventually conclusive, giving Zulfaqar Khan and his brother a chance to escape to Qandahar whilst Herat came under occupation but was surprisingly neither looted nor sacked by Nader's troops. Ibrahim Khan managed to conquer Farah, helping to pacify the region as a whole in addition to Nader's policies of forced emigration for many of the tribes involved in the rebellion, as well as incorporating many of their fighters into his own armed forces.

== Conquest of the Caucasus ==
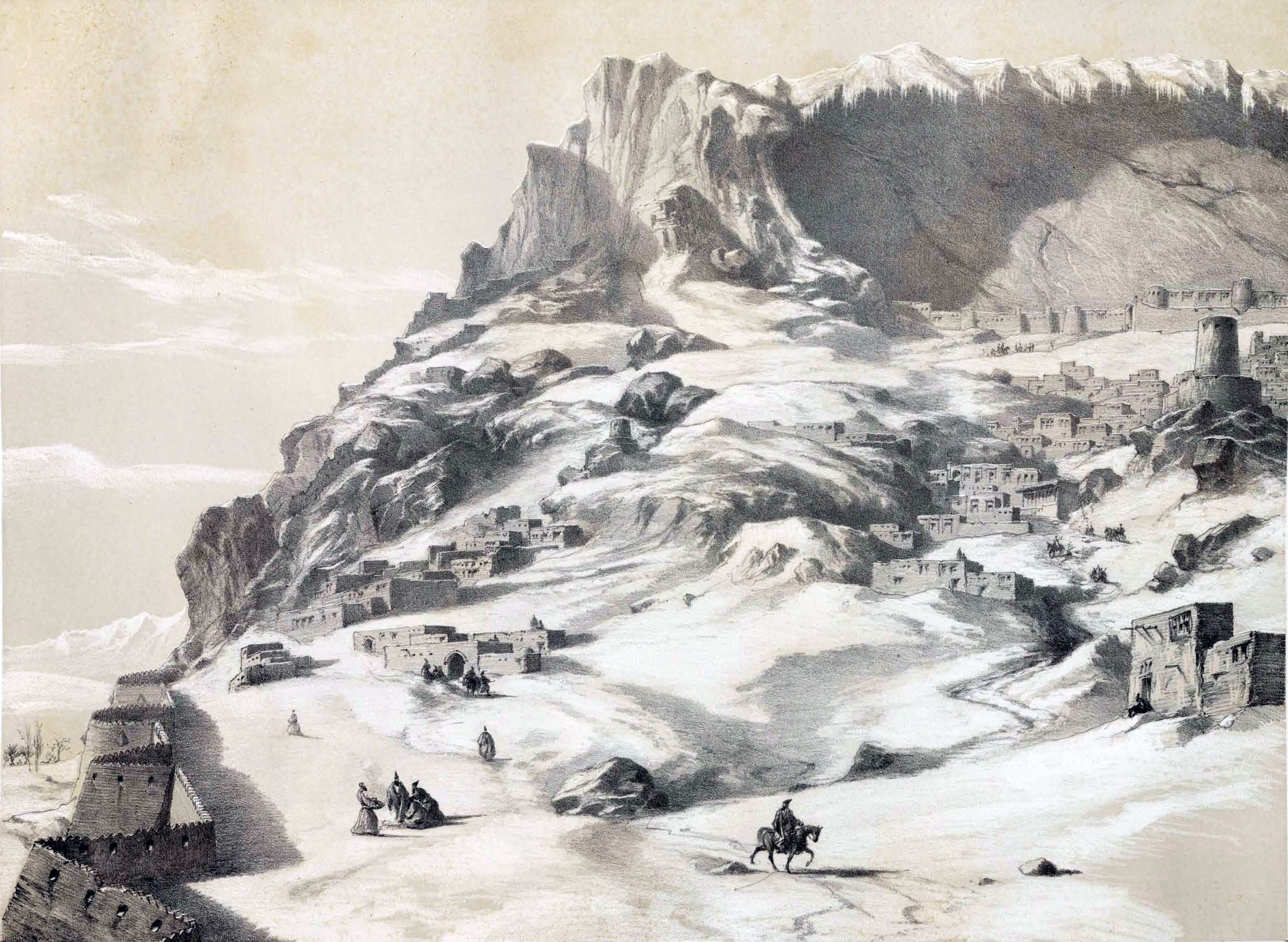
An artist's illustration of an Armenian-Iranian border town in the Caucasus

After Nader put down the revolt in Afghanistan, he was able to continue his invasion of the Ottoman Empire and the Caucasus which ended in an Iranian victory allowing Nader to recast Iranian hegemony over almost the entire Caucasus region, reconquering it for the Safavid state.

=== Strategic Context ===
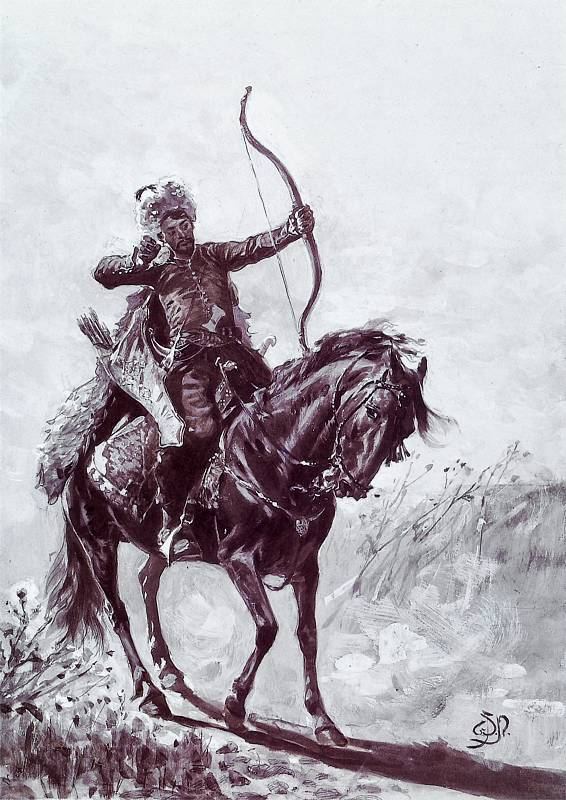
Nader's decisive victory at Baghavard destroyed any hope of the Crimean Tatars joining the main Ottoman army on the field.

The Caucasus had fallen under Ottoman control since 1722 with the collapse of the Safavid state. The first target of the campaign was to reconquer the Shirvan Khanate, with its capital Shamakhi falling in August 1734, freeing up the Iranian forces to march west and lay siege to Ganja. The battlements of Ganja as well as its garrison of 14,000 soldiers provided a formidable defence. After Tahmasp Khan Jalayer engaged and routed a joint Ottoman and Crimean Tatar force in the South-East of the Caucasus, Nader cut their line of retreat further west dealing them another crippling blow, scattering them into the northern mountains.

The mountains northwards of Avarestan made any pursuit of the defeated foe a daunting prospect, especially when considering the approach of winter. Nader therefore chose to turn west and to besiege Ganja where he was drawn into an intense effort to capture the surprisingly formidable fortress. The Iranian artillery was still severely lacking in strong siege guns and mostly consisted of field batteries which were effective in battles but unable to make a significant impact on city walls and battlements.

Failing in their siege artillery capacity, the Iranians sent sappers to dig underground to reach the citadels walls from beneath but the Turks received timely intelligence reports revealing the intention of the besiegers. Tunnelling underground the Iranians and Ottomans burrowed into each other's way whence they came to grips in hand-to-hand combat. The Iranians were able to detonate six charges killing 700 Ottoman defenders but still failed in their main object of destroying the citadels walls. The Iranians also lost some 30 to 40 men themselves.

Nader also blockaded Yerevan and Tiflis forcing a response from the Ottoman 'Saraskar' Koprulu Pasha. Istanbul had found the preliminary negotiations, led by Ahmad Pasha, governor of Ottoman Baghdad, quite unsatisfactory to its liking, and sent an enormous army consisting of 50,000 cavalry, 30,000 janissaries and 40 cannons to be commanded by Koprulu Pasha for the defence of Ottoman possessions in the region.

=== The Battle of Yeghevārd ===
Nader, having besieged many of the key cities and fortresses in the area, awaited the arrival of Koprulu Pasha's main army of some 130,000 men according to Nader's court historian Mirza Mehdi Khan Astarabadi, prompting Nader to gather his advance guard of around 15,000 men and march them westwards to engage the relief army under Koprulu Pasha. By the time the main Iranian army of 40,000 reached the battlefield, Nader, despite the enormous disparity in numbers in his disfavour, routed the Ottomans, forcing Istanbul to finally sign a peace treaty securing Iranian control over the Caucasus and the border in Mesopotamia - two points it had already agreed to in the treaty of Zuhab.

The crushing defeat at Baghavard also provided a sufficient impetus to the 50,000 Crimean Tatars who were commanded by the Turkish Sultan to march south along the coast of the Black Sea descending down into the Caucasus in order to aid Koprulu Pasha's forces to retreat back to their base.

== Conquest of India ==
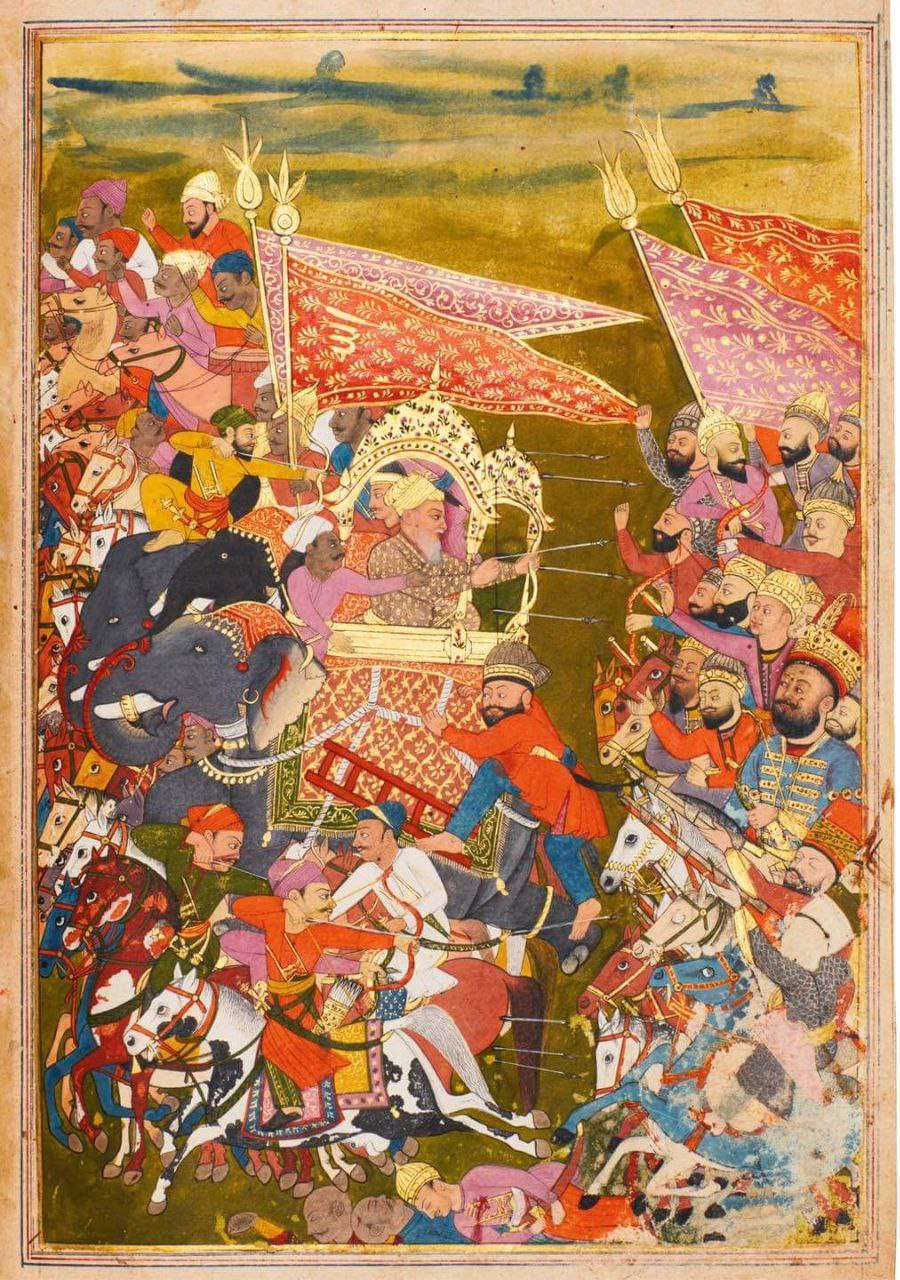
An illustrated page of a copy of the Jahangosha-ye Naderi, showing Nader Shah fighting the Mughal army. Created in northern India in 1757/58

Emperor Nader Shah, the Shah of Iran (1736–47) and founder of the Afsharid dynasty, invaded the Mughal Empire with a fifty-five thousand strong army, eventually attacking Delhi in March 1739. His army easily defeated the Mughals at the battle at Karnal and would eventually capture the Mughal capital in the aftermath of the battle.

Nader Shah's victory against the weak and crumbling Mughal Empire in the Far East meant that he could afford to turn back and resume his war against Iran's archrival, the neighbouring Ottoman Empire, but also the further campaigns in the North Caucasus and Central Asia.

=== Invasion ===
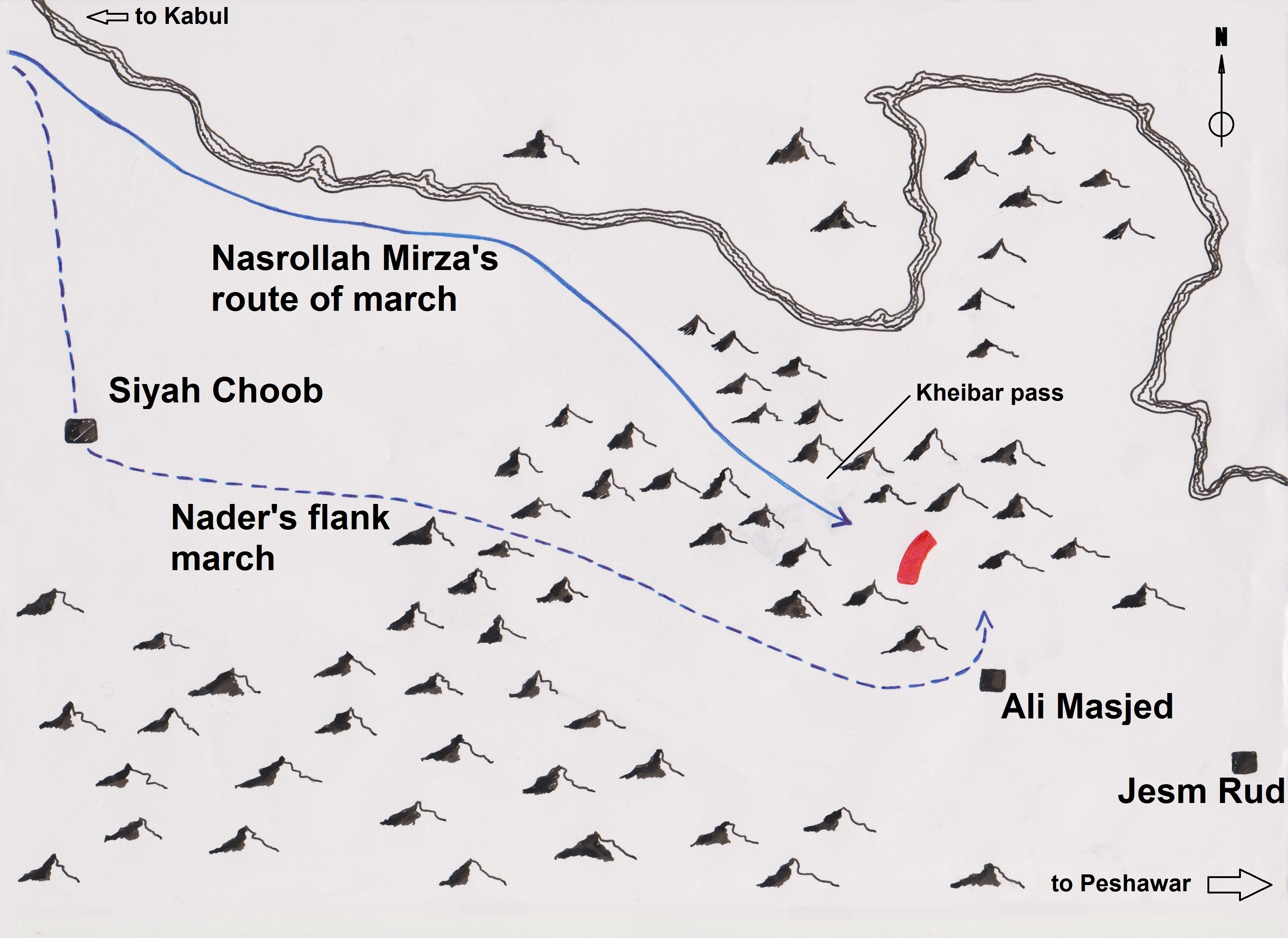
A map of the Kheibar campaign, illustrating Nader's incredible 80 kilometre flank-march

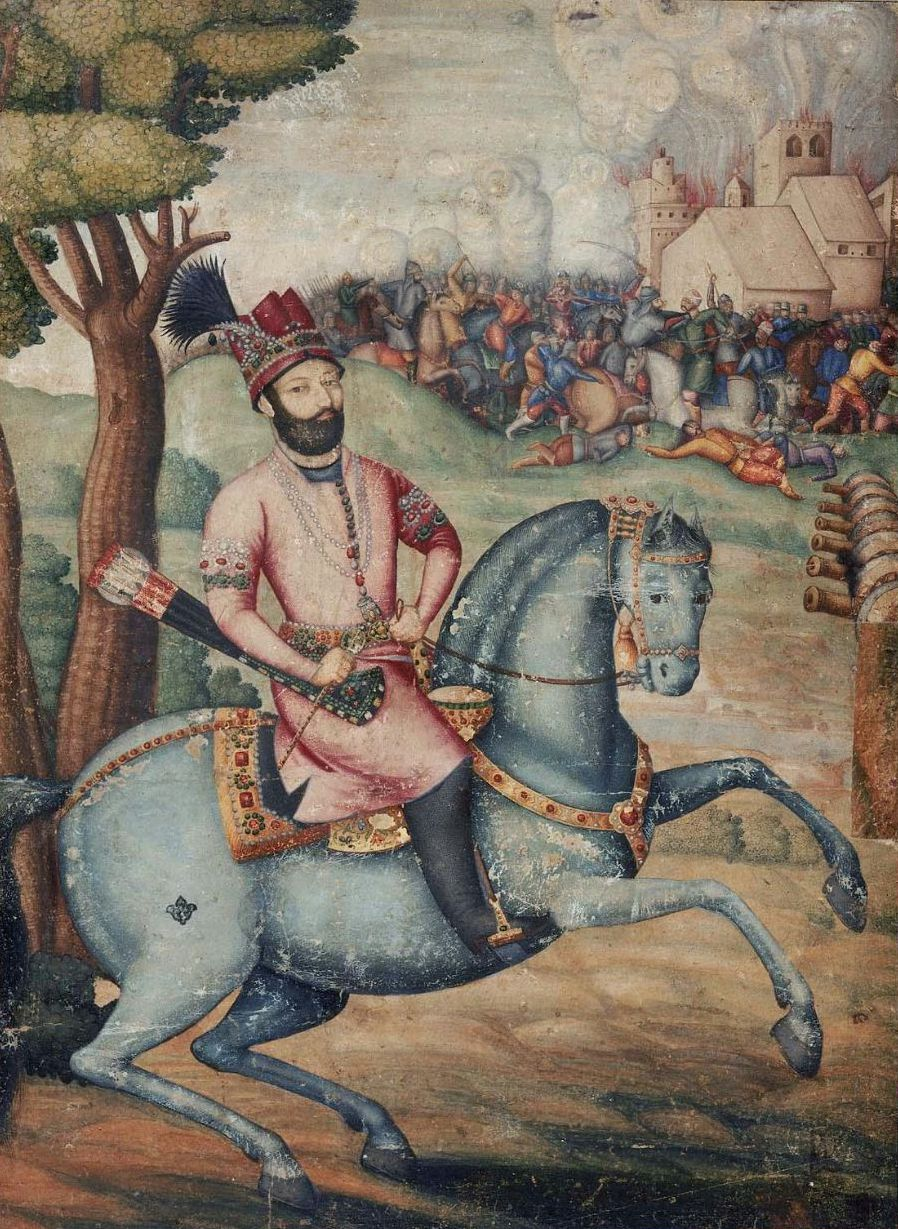
Nader Shah at the Sack of Delhi – Battle scene with Nader Shah on horseback

Nader Shah became the official Iranian monarch in 1736, and founded the Afsharid dynasty in that year overthrowing the last puppet Safavid shah after the successful campaign of 1730–35. In 1738, Nader Shah conquered Kandahar, the last outpost of the Hotaki dynasty. He then began to launch raids across the Hindu Kush mountains into Northern India, which, at that time, was under the rule of the Mughal Empire.

The Mughal empire had been weakened by ruinous wars of succession in the three decades following the death of Aurangzeb. The Muslim nobles had asserted their independence whilst the Hindu Marathas of the Maratha Empire had captured vast swathes of territory in Central and Northern India. Its ruler, Muhammad Shah, proved unable to stop the disintegration of the empire. The imperial court administration was corrupt and weak whereas the country was extremely rich whilst Delhi's prosperity and prestige was still at a high. Nader Shah, attracted by the country's wealth, sought plunder like so many other foreign invaders before him.

Nader had asked Muhammad Shah to close the Mughal frontiers around Kabul so that the Afghan rebels he was fighting against, may not seek refuge in Kabul. Even though the Emperor agreed, he practically took no action. Nader seized upon this as a pretext for war. Together with his Georgian subject Erekle II (Heraclius II), who took part in the expedition as a commander leading a contingent of Georgian troops, the long march had begun. He defeated his Afghan enemies fleeing into the Hindu Kush and also seized major cities in the region such as Ghazni on 31 May, Kabul on 19 June, and Peshawar (18 November), before advancing onto the Punjab and capturing Lahore. Nader advanced to the river Indus before the end of year as the Mughals mustered their army against him.

At the Battle of Karnal on 13 February 1739, Nader led his army to victory over the Mughals, Muhammad Shah surrendered and both entered Delhi together. The keys to the capital of Delhi were surrendered to Nader. He entered the city on 20 March 1739 and occupied Shah Jehan's imperial suite in the Red Fort. Coins were struck, and prayers said, in his name in the Jama Masjid and other Delhi mosques. The next day, the Shah held a great durbar in the capital.

=== Massacre ===
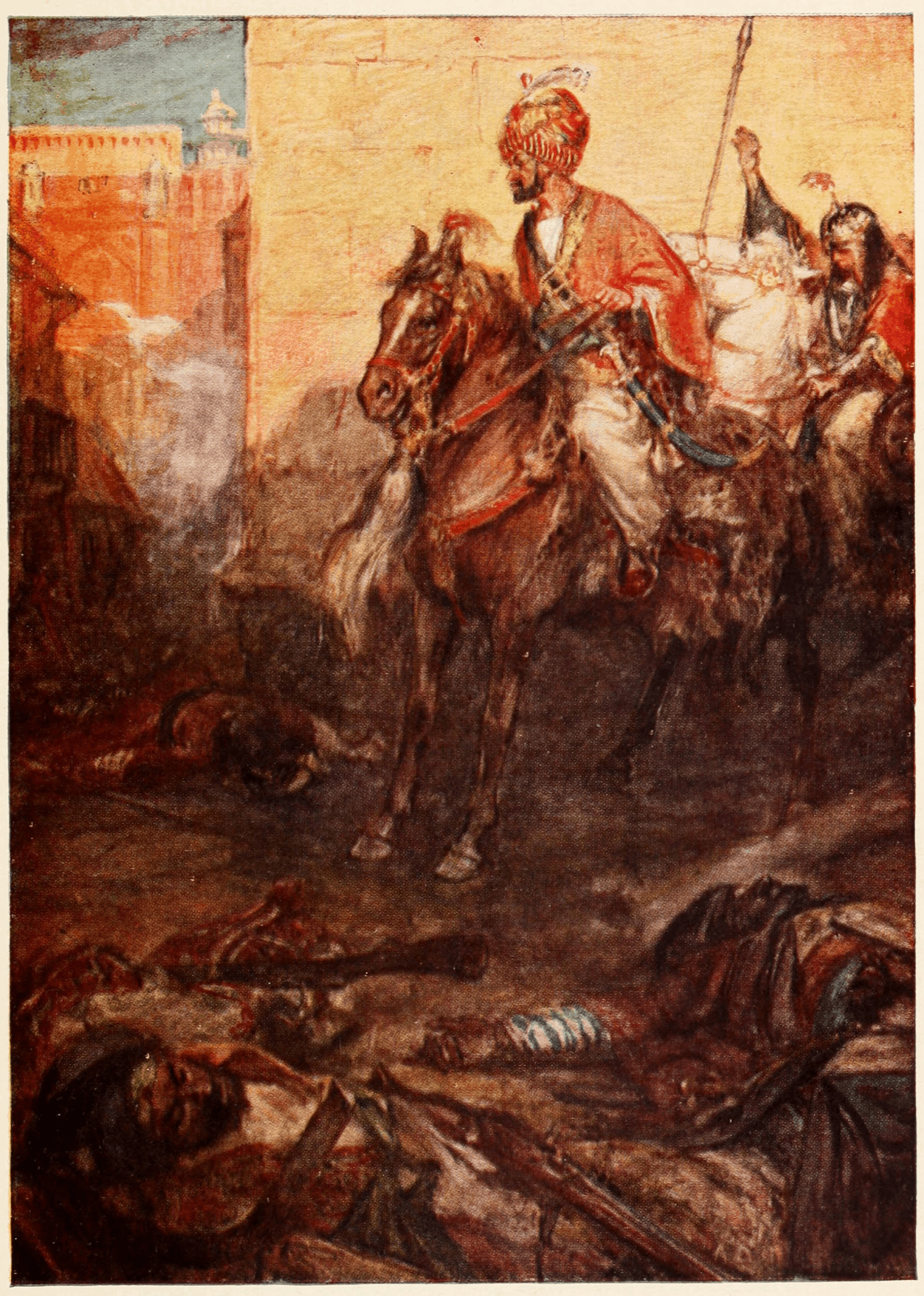
Nader shah watching the dead bodies of his soldiers murdered by Delhi people

The Iranian occupation led to price rises in the city. The city administrator attempted to fix prices at a lower level and Iranian troops were sent to the market at Paharganj, Delhi, to enforce them. However, the local merchants refused to accept the lower prices and this resulted in violence during which some Iranians were assaulted and killed.

When a rumour spread that Nader had been assassinated by a female guard at the Red Fort, some Indians attacked and killed Iranian troops during the riots that broke out on the night of 21 March. Nader, furious at the killings, retaliated by ordering his soldiers to carry out the notorious qatl-e-aam (qatl = killing, aam = publicly, in open) of Delhi.

On the morning of 22 March, the Shah rode out in full armour and took a seat at the Sunehri Masjid of Roshan-ud-dowla near the Kotwali Chabutra in the middle of Chandni Chowk. Accompanied by the rolling of drums and the blaring of trumpets, he then unsheathed his battle sword in a grand flourish to the acclaim and wild cheers of the Iranian troops present. This was the signal to start the onslaught. Almost immediately, the fully-armed Iranian army of occupation turned its swords and guns against the unarmed and defenceless civilians in the city. The Iranian soldiers were given full licence to do as they pleased and promised a share of the booty as the city was plundered.

Areas of Delhi such as Chandni Chowk and Dariba Kalan, Fatehpuri, Faiz Bazar, Hauz Kazi, Johri Bazar and the Lahori, Ajmeri and Kabuli gates, all of which were densely populated by both Hindus and Muslims, were soon covered with corpses. Muslims, like Hindus and Sikhs, resorted to killing their women, children and themselves rather than submit to the Iranians. These events were recorded in contemporary chronicles such as the Tarikh-e-Hindi of Rustam Ali, the Bayan-e-Waqai of Abdul Karim and the Tazkira of Anand Ram Mukhlis.

In the words of the Tazkira:

"Here and there some opposition was offered, but in most places people were butchered unresistingly. The Persians laid violent hands on everything and everybody. For a long time, streets remained strewn with corpses, as the walks of a garden with dead leaves and flowers. The town was reduced to ashes."

Muhammad Shah was forced to beg for mercy.

Finally, after many hours of desperate pleading by the Mughals for mercy, Nader Shah relented and signalled a halt to the bloodshed by sheathing his battle sword once again.

=== Casualties ===
It has been estimated that during the course of six hours in one day, i.e. 22 March 1739, around 20,000 to 30,000 Indian men, women and children were slaughtered by the Iranian troops during the massacre in the city. Exact casualty figures are uncertain, as the bodies of the victims were simply buried in mass burial pits or cremated in grand funeral pyres after the massacre, without any proper record being made of the numbers cremated or buried.

=== Plunder ===
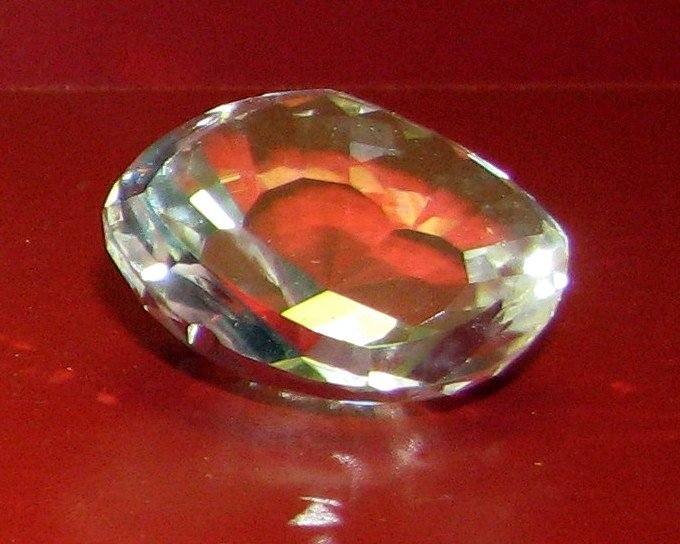
A replica of the Koh-i Noor Diamond taken by Nader Shah, along with many other gems, as a trophy of war

The city was sacked for several days. An enormous fine of 20 million rupees was levied on the people of Delhi. Muhammad Shah handed over the keys to the royal treasury, and lost the Peacock Throne, to Nader Shah, which thereafter served as a symbol of Iranian imperial might. Amongst a treasure trove of other fabulous jewels, Nader also gained the Koh-i-Noor and Darya-ye Noor ("Mountain of Light" and "Sea of Light," respectively) diamonds; they are now part of the British and Iranian Crown Jewels, respectively. The total value of the plunder was estimated by contemporary Mughal chroniclers at approximately 700 million rupees. This influx of wealth allowed Nader to suspend domestic taxation in Iran for a period following his return. Iranian troops left Delhi in the beginning of May 1739.

=== Aftermath ===
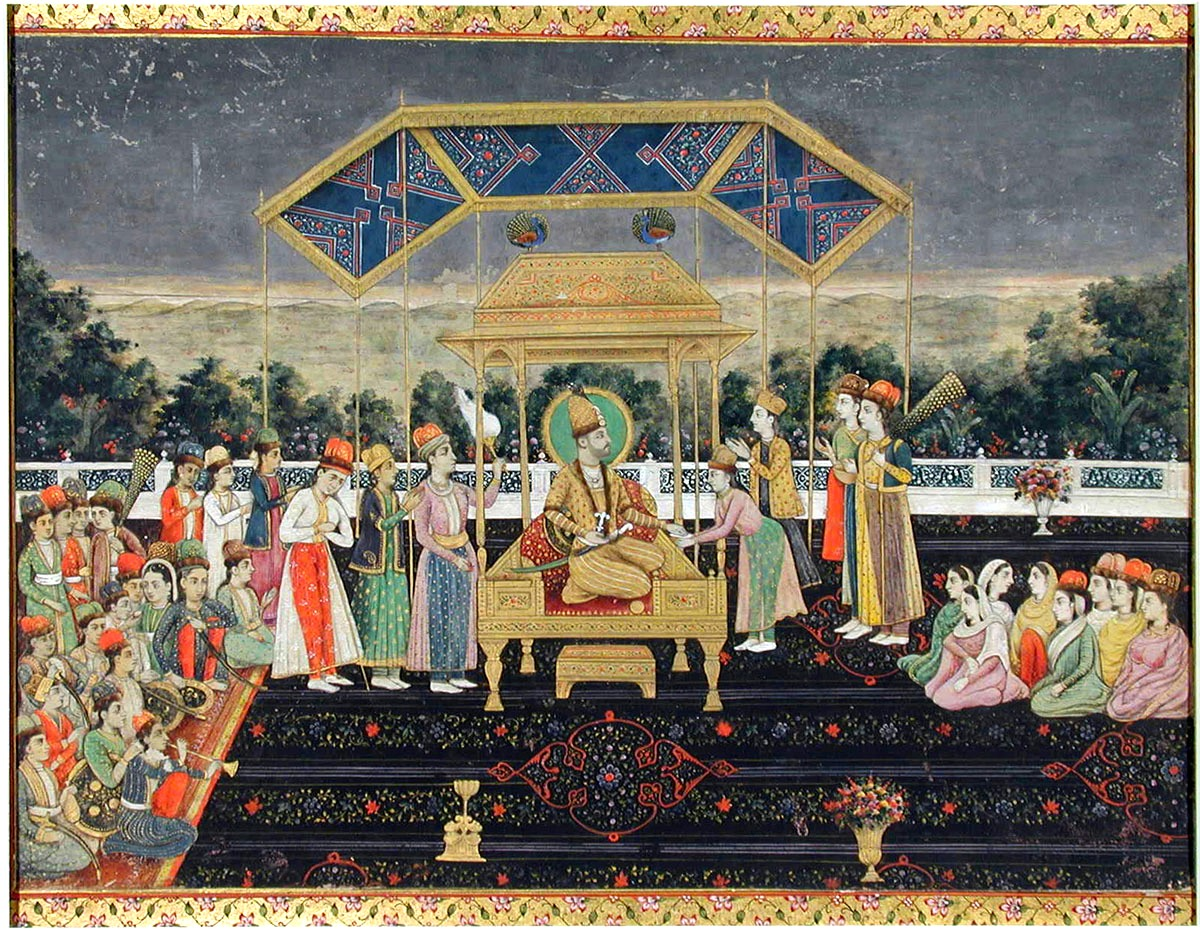
Nader Shah sitting upon the Peacock Throne after his victory at the Battle of Karnal.

The plunder seized from Delhi was so rich that Nader stopped taxation in Iran for a period of three years following his return. Nader Shah's victory against the crumbling Mughal Empire in the East meant that he could afford to turn to the West and face the Ottomans. The Ottoman Sultan Mahmud I initiated the Ottoman-Iranian War (1743–1746), in which Muhammad Shah closely cooperated with the Ottomans until his death in 1748.

Nader's Indian campaign made the East India Company realise the extreme weakness of the Mughal Empire and the possibility of expanding its own activities to fill the power vacuum.

== Conquest of Central Asia ==
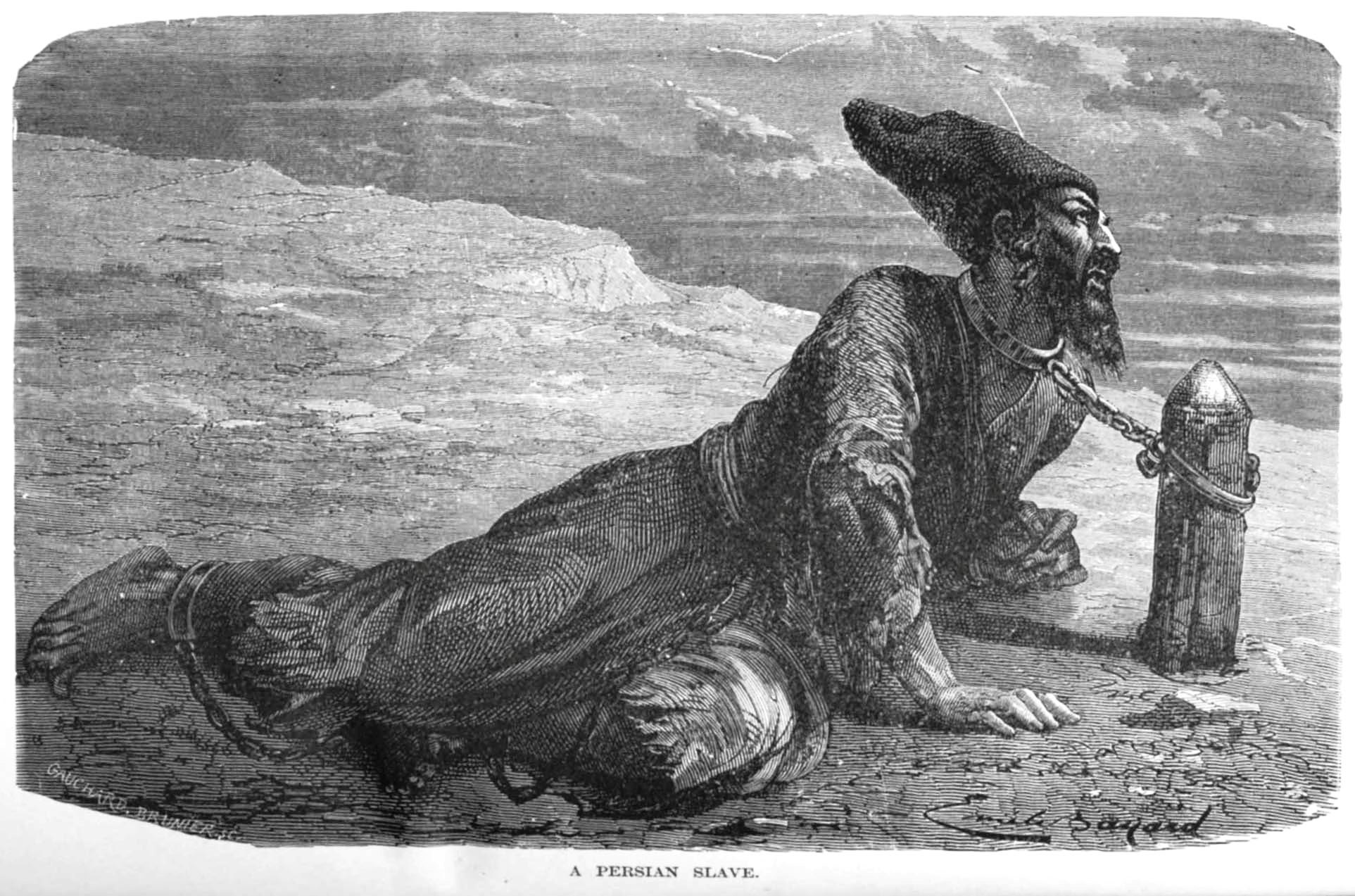
An Iranian slave held in captivity in Central Asia. The Khanates beyond the Iranian Empires border carried out regular raids into the border towns and villages which they would sack and loot.

During the mid-eighteenth century, the Iranian empire of Nader Shah embarked upon the conquest and annexation of the Khanates of Bukhara and Khiva. The initial engagements were fought in the late 1730s by Nader Shah's son and viceroy Reza Qoli Mirza, who gained a few notable victories in this theatre of operations while Nader was still invading India to the south. Reza Qoli's invasion of Khiva angered Ilbars Khan, the leader of Khiva. When Ilbars threatened to mount a counterattack, Nader ordered hostilities to cease despite his son's successes and later returned victoriously from Delhi to embark on a decisive campaign himself. After annexing Khiva, he executed Ilbars and replaced the latter with Abu al-Fayz Khan, whom Nader considered to be more accepting of Nader's overlordship. The conflict resulted in the most overwhelming Iranian triumph against the khanates of Central Asia in modern history and with the admixture of his previous annexation in northern India, Nader's empire in the east surpassed all other Iranian empires before it, all the way back to the Sassanians and Achaemenids of Antiquity. Following the subjugation of the region, Nader ordered the forced relocation of various Central Asian tribes to the western and northern frontiers of Iran to serve as border garrisons, a policy consistent with his broader strategy of dispersing potentially rebellious tribal confederations.

== Conquest of Dagestan ==
The conflict between the Iranian Empire and the Dagestani people was intermittently fought throughout the mid-1730s, during Nader's first campaign in the Caucasus, until the very last years of his reign and assassination in 1747. The incredibly difficult terrain of the Northern Caucasus region made the task of subduing the various Dagestani tribes extremely challenging. Despite this, Nader Shah gained numerous strongholds and fortresses in Dagestan and pushed his adversaries to the very verge of defeat. However, the Dagestani rebels held on in the northernmost reaches of Daghestan and continued to defy Iranian domination. The conflict was to be fought over many years and only included a few years of actually intensive fighting, usually when Nader himself was present, but otherwise consisted of skirmishes and raids. The majority of the Iranian casualties were due to the extreme weather, as well as to the outbreak of diseases, all of which combined with the indomitable will of the Dagestani people to wage an insurgency and retreat to their distant strongholds when threatened with a pitched battle. All these elements combined made the entire war a quagmire for Nader's forces. Ultimately, the Dagestani insurgents who had held on in the northern fortresses marched south upon hearing of Nader's assassination and reclaimed most of their lost territories as the Iranian empire crumbled.

== Invasion of the Persian Gulf ==
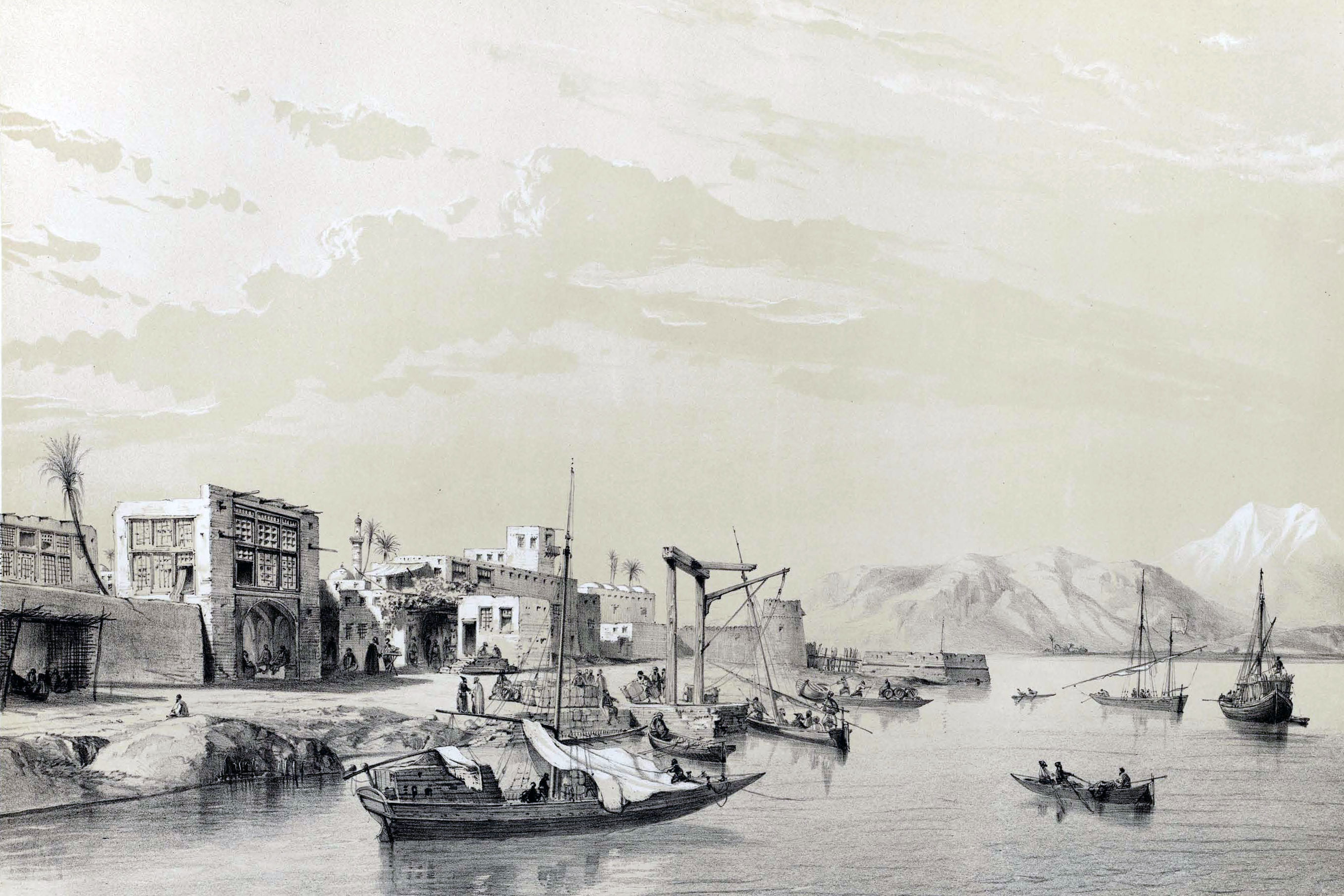
Bandar-e-Bushehr, historically one of Persia's most important port cities around the Persian Gulf

The Afsharid Conquest of the Persian Gulf was an imperial venture by the Iranian Empire, ruled by Nader Shah, to establish Iran as the hegemon of the Persian Gulf and its surroundings. The numerous campaigns which were undertaken were initially very successful and achieved a great many objectives. However, the rebellion of Nader's appointee, daryabegi (Admiral) Mohammad Taqi Khan, wreaked havoc amongst the plethora of polities across the Persian Gulf that had been brought under Iranian control and even after the defeat and capture of Mohammad Taqi Khan the Iranian empire was going through a tumultuous period of unrelenting civil strife and internal war due to Nader's increasingly brutal rule, which made the empire collapse in the immediate aftermath of his assassination, leading to many of the conquests in the region to be lost. To secure maritime routes, Nader initiated shipbuilding operations in Bushehr, purchasing European vessels and attempting to establish a naval presence in the Persian Gulf.

== Second Ottoman War ==
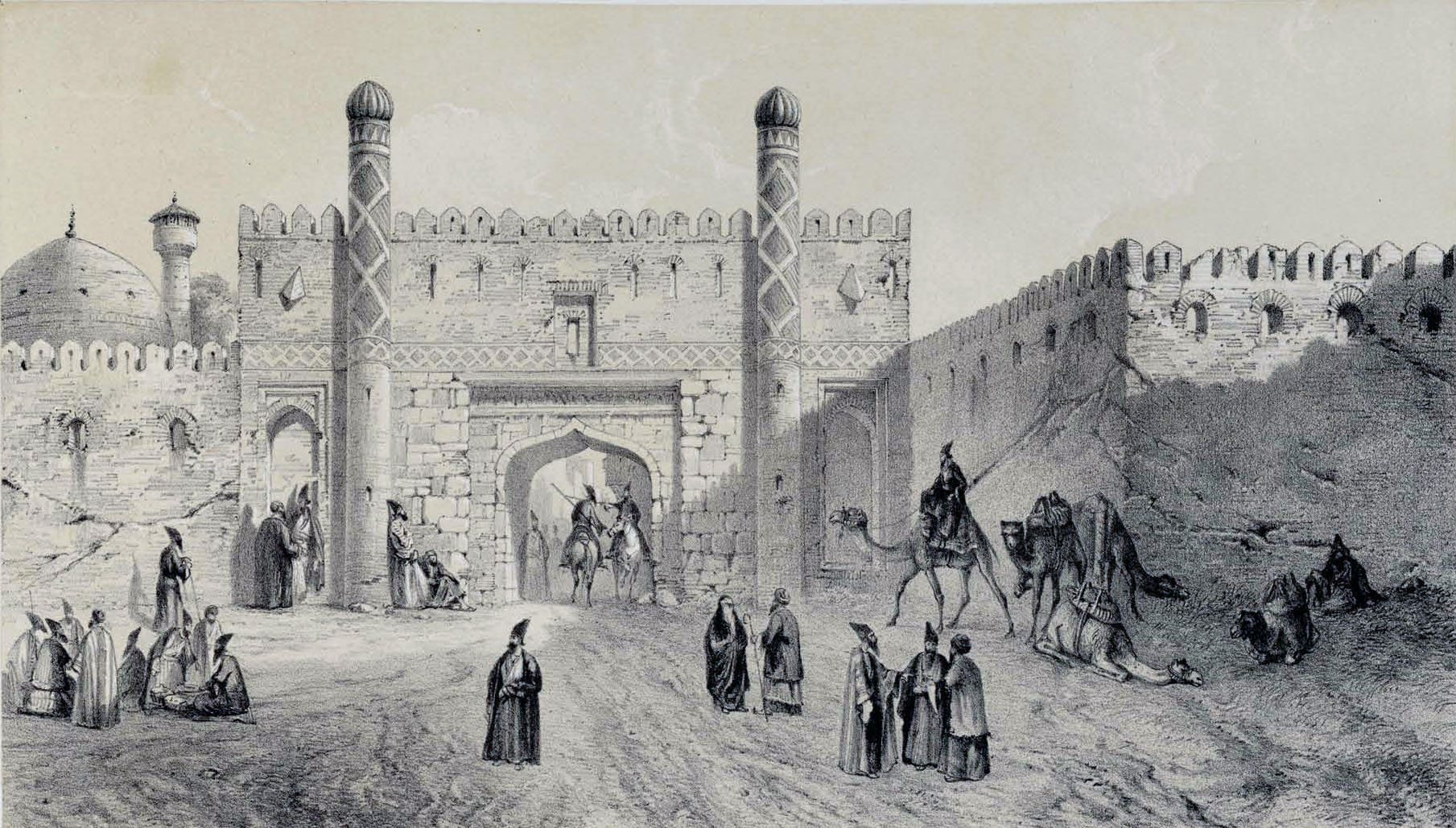
Tabriz' city gates; Tabriz was the centre of political and military might of the Iranian empire in the Southern Caucasus

Nader attempted to ratify the Treaty of Constantinople (1736), by demanding that the Ja'fari, a small Shi'ite sect was to be accepted as the fifth legal sect of Islam.

In 1743, Nader Shah declared war on the Ottoman Empire. He demanded the surrender of Baghdad. The Iranians had captured Baghdad in 1623 and Mosul in 1624, but the Ottomans had recaptured Mosul and Bagdad in 1625 and 1638 respectively. The Treaty of Zuhab signed between the Ottoman Empire and the Safavid Empire in 1639 had resulted in 85 years of peace. After the fall of the Safavid dynasty, Russia and the Ottoman Empire agreed to divide the northwest and the Caspian region of Iran, but with the advent of Nader Shah, the Russians and the Turks withdrew from the region. Nader Shah waged war against the Ottomans from 1730 to 1736 but it ended in a stalemate. Nader Shah subsequently turned east and declared war on the Moghul Empire and invaded India, in order to refund his wars against the Ottomans..

=== The war ===
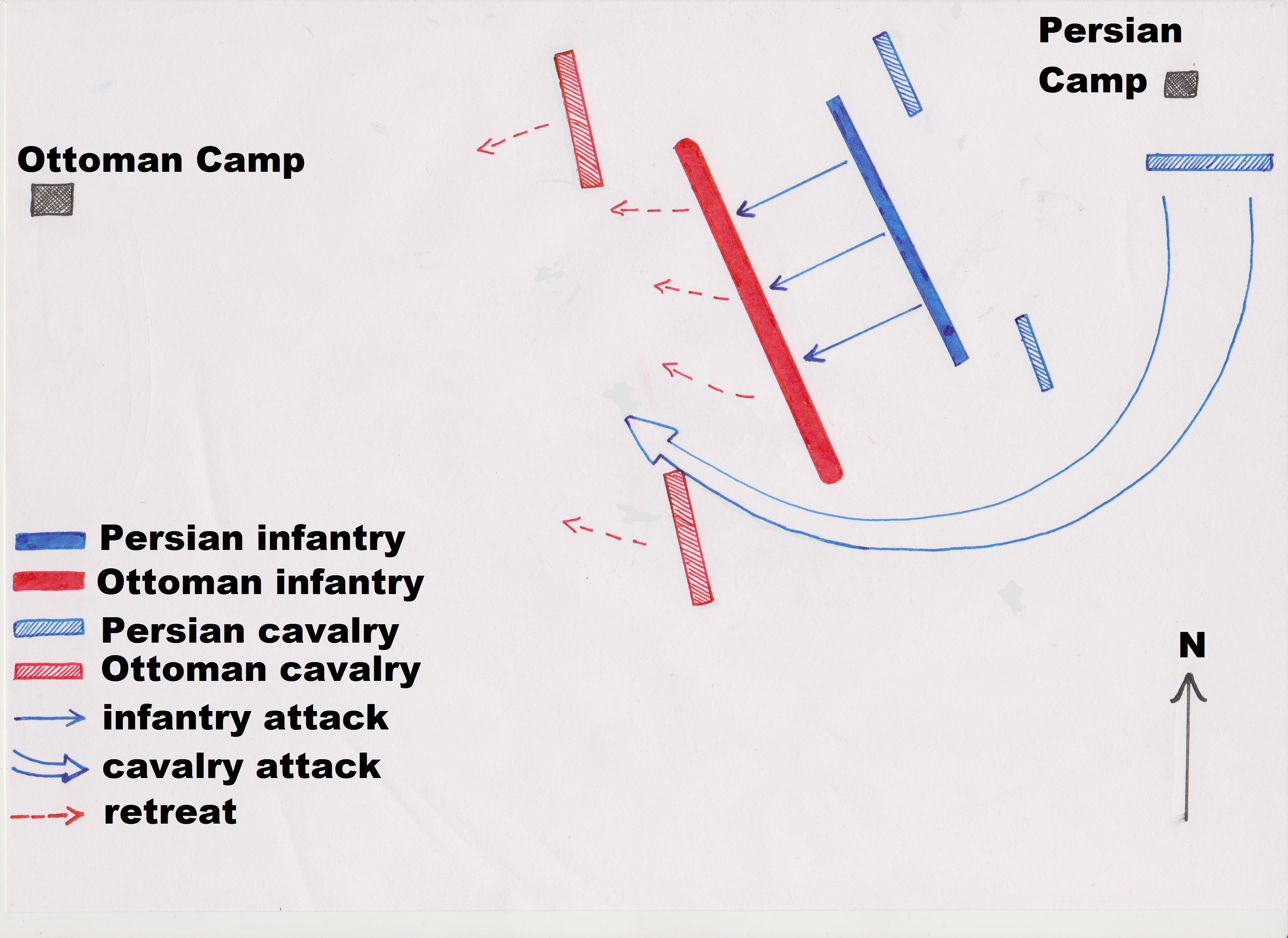
The Battle of Kars (1745) was the last major field battle fought by Nader in his spectacular military career

Nader Shah dreamed of an empire which would stretch from the Indus to the Bosphorus. Therefore, he raised an army of 200,000, which largely consisted of rebellious Central Asian tribesmen, with whom he planned to march onto Constantinople, but after he learned that the Ottoman ulema was preparing for a holy war against Iran, he turned eastwards. He captured Kirkuk, Arbil and besieged Mosul on 14 September 1743. The siege lasted for 40 days. The Pasha of Mosul, Hajji Hossein Al Jalili, successfully defended Mosul and Nader Shah was forced to retreat. The offensive was halted due to revolts in Iran (1743–44) over high taxes. Hostilities also spilled into Georgia, where Prince Givi Amilakhvari employed an Ottoman force in a futile attempt to undermine the Iranian influence and dislodge Nader's Georgian allies, Princes Teimuraz and Erekle.

In early 1744, Nader Shah resumed his offensive and besieged Kars, but returned to Dagestan to suppress a revolt. He returned afterwards and routed an Ottoman army at the battle of Kars in August 1745. The war ended in a stalemate. Nader Shah grew insane and started to punish his own subjects, which led to a revolt from early 1745 to June 1746. In 1746, a peace was made. The boundaries were left unchanged and Baghdad remained in Ottoman hands. Nader Shah dropped his demand for Ja'fari recognition. The Porte was pleased and dispatched an ambassador but before he could arrive, Nader Shah was assassinated by his own officers.

== See also ==
- Military of the Afsharid dynasty of Iran
- Safavid Empire
- Afsharid Empire
- Ottoman Empire
- Russian Empire
- Mughal Empire
- Treaty of Ganja
- Treaty of Constantinople

== Sources ==
- Moghtader, Gholam-Hussein (2008). The Great Batlles of Nader Shah, Donyaye Ketab
- Axworthy, Michael (2009). The Sword of Persia: Nader Shah, from tribal warrior to conquering tyrant, I. B. Tauris
- Ghafouri, Ali (2008). History of Iran's wars: from the Medes to now, Etela'at Publishing
