= Mohammad Khan Baluch's Rebellion =

Mohammad Khan Baloch's Rebellion
- Part of Nader's Campaigns
Date	1733–1734
Location	Southern Persia
Result	Safavid victory: Rebellion quelled
Territorial changes	The south of the empire is brought back under government control

Belligerents
Safavid Empire	Forces loyal to Mohammad Khan Baloch

Commanders and leaders
Nader; Tahmasp Khan Jalayer; Ahmad Khan (POW); Kirklu Karim Khan (POW)	Mohammad Khan Baloch (POW) (DOW)

Strength
~5,000 (Ahmad Khan) ~12,000 (Kirklu Karim Khan) ~12,000 (Tahmasp Khan Jalayer)	Unknown

Casualties and losses
15,000 deaths	3000 deaths

In the aftermath of Nader's crippling defeat and expulsion from Ottoman Baghdad, the commander who was put in charge of the 12,000 soldiers to maintain the siege of the city, Mohammad Khan Baloch, fled from Mesopotamia and returned to southern Persia, where, taking advantage of Nader's shattered prestige due to his ignominious defeat at the hands of Topal Pasha at the Battle of Samarra, Mohammad Khan raised the banner of rebellion in the south of the country. He also allied with Sheikh Ahmad Madani's revolt.

Nader Guli sent the Shirazian vali to Megasets to suppress the uprising. Upon his arrival, he himself rebelled against Nader Guli and even collected troops for a campaign on Isfahan. Mohammad Khan Baloch went to the Bender area to recruit soldiers, and interrupted a number of residents who did not want to join him. Mohammad Khan Baloch took those who agreed to serve with him into his army and went to Shiraz, where he began to prepare for the campaign on Isfahan.

== Letter from Nader Shah ==
"What are you up to? You were always our faithful servant and did only good deeds. I exalted you and you were my best general, so why did you raise your weapon against me? Repent and turn from the chosen path back, and God forbid that your eyes become confused!"

However, Mohammad Khan Baloch rejected Nader's demand and replied: "I firmly decided to sacrifice myself for the task I had set. May Allah repay what He pleases, for you, and me! Or I will die by your hand or you from mine! Know that!"

== Nader forsakes Mesopotamia ==
Returning from the debacle in front of the gates of Baghdad, Mohammad Khan Baloch seized the opportunity that this vacuum of power and authority in the country afforded him to take up arms in the hope of carving out his own independent fiefdom. After the decisive victory of the Ottomans in the first Mesopotamian campaign, Nader managed to rebuild his army in an astonishingly small time frame and take to the field once more, this time crushing the main Ottoman army and capturing all its guns and baggage. Poised to take Baghdad, he was ultimately forced to turn back and deal with Mohammad Khan's strengthening rebellion. Marching southeast, Nader was joined by Tahmasp Khan Jalayer as well as the governor of Kohgiluyeh.

== Сrushing rebels ==
When Nader learned of this response, he interrupted the negotiations and moved to Shiraz. Seeing that the troops of Nader Guli were approaching, Mohammad Khan Baloch left the city and met him on the plain. In the battle, Mehmed Khan's troops were exterminated, and he himself managed to escape and hide in the fortress of, which was near Bender.

== Mohammad Khan's gruesome demise ==
The rebel leader fled to Shiraz and on to the coast of the Persian Gulf, where he sought to escape to an island using the services of some pirates. Eventually, he was arrested and taken back to Nader, who ordered his eyes to be gouged out. Nader also ordered reprisals against the population centres in the south that were connected to the revolt; many of the tribes that had participated were forcibly migrated further east. Mohammad Khan Baloch later died due to the severity of his injuries.

== See also ==
- Mohammad Khan Baloch
- Afsharid dynasty
- Safavid dynasty
- Shiraz
- Nader Shah

== Sources ==
- Michael Axworthy, The Sword of Persia: Nader Shah, from Tribal Warrior to Conquering Tyrant Hardcover 348 pages (26 July 2006) Publisher: I.B. Tauris Language: English ISBN 1-85043-706-8
