= Mohammad Khan Baloch =

- Governor of Kohgiluyeh, Khuzestan, fars
- Born: 1698
- Died: 1734; Ali Qapu, Isfahan
- Religion: Sunni Islam

Mohammad Khan Baloch (Balochi:محمد هان بلۏچ) was a Baloch military commander and statesman during Safavid dynasty and Afsharid Persia.

He joined the Mahmud Hotak that toppled the Safavid dynasty, leading to the establishment of the Hotak dynasty and he was sent to the Ottoman embassy their behalf. After returning to Iran after the fall of the Afghans, he was one of the commanders of Nader Shah's army, and de facto governor of many areas and gained control over the southern states of Iran.

== Biography ==
=== Recruitment under Nader ===
Mohammad Khan Baloch was initially an ambassador for the Hotaki Dynasty and was dispatched to Istanbul, however after his return in 1730 he encountered Nader Shah in the Zagros mountains. His life was spared with governorship over Kohgiluyeh and Arabistan being granted in exchange for him revealing the details of the negotiation.

=== Governorship under Safavid yoke ===
Mohammad Khan Baloch became military commander in Safavid Iran, who functioned as governor under Nader Shah. He initially remained loyal and aided Nader in recruiting troops and enforcing tax increases in his respectively owned territory.

=== Role in the Baghdad Campaign ===
Willem Floor reported that nader gave Mohammad Khan Baloch, who had shown his bravery in capturing enemy forts, the position of commander of the army.

During the Safavid Siege of Baghdad, Mohammad Khan Baloch was granted "at least 12,000 troops" (according to Axworthy) by Nader as the latter departed to Samarra to meet Ottoman reinforcements. However, he had to abandon the endeavor after the Persian defeat at Samarra and subsequent regrouping between Ahmad Pasha and Topal Osman Pasha in July of 1733.

The subsequent retreat of the Persians from Baghdad saw numerous captives and casualties including 3,000 prisoners of war which were executed by Ahmad Pasha. Mohammad Khan Baloch returned to Kohguliyeh after the failure with the intent to revolt against Nader's rapacious taxation.

== Mohammad Khan Baluch's Rebellion ==
Mohammad Khan raised the banner of rebellion in the south of the country. He also allied with Sheikh Ahmad Madani's revolt. took those who agreed to serve with him into his army and went to Shiraz, where he began to prepare for the campaign on Isfahan.

By the time Nader returned from Kirkuk, much of the Persian Gulf was captured by the rebellion. Mohammad Khan met Nader at the Shulestan Valley in 1734 and suffered a decisive defeat with only around 300 of his supporters escaping.

By the help of British and Dutch and their ships, Nader surrounded island of Kish and Mohammad Khan Baloch was arrested and sent to Isfahan. Eventually, he was arrested and taken back to Nader, who ordered his eyes to be gouged out. Nader also ordered reprisals against the population centres in the south that were connected to the revolt; many of the tribes that had participated were forcibly migrated further east. Mohammad Khan Baloch later died due to the severity of his injuries.

== See also ==
- Mohammad Khan Baluch's Rebellion
