= Maragh, Hormozgan =

Maragh مراغ
- Village
- Location within Iran
- Coordinates: 26°51′47″N 54°19′49″E
- Country: Iran
- Province: Hormozgan
- County: Bandar Lengeh
- Bakhsh: Shibkaveh
- Rural District: Bandar Charak

Population (2006)
  - Total: 649
- Time zone: UTC+3:30 (IRST)
  - Summer (DST): UTC+4:30 (IRDT)

Maragh (Persian: مراغ, also Romanized as Marāgh) is a village in Bandar Charak Rural District, Shibkaveh District, Bandar Lengeh County, Hormozgan Province, Iran. At the 2006 census, its population was 649, in 121 families.
