= Sabzevar expedition =

Part of Nader's campaigns (1727–28)

- Part of Nader's Campaigns
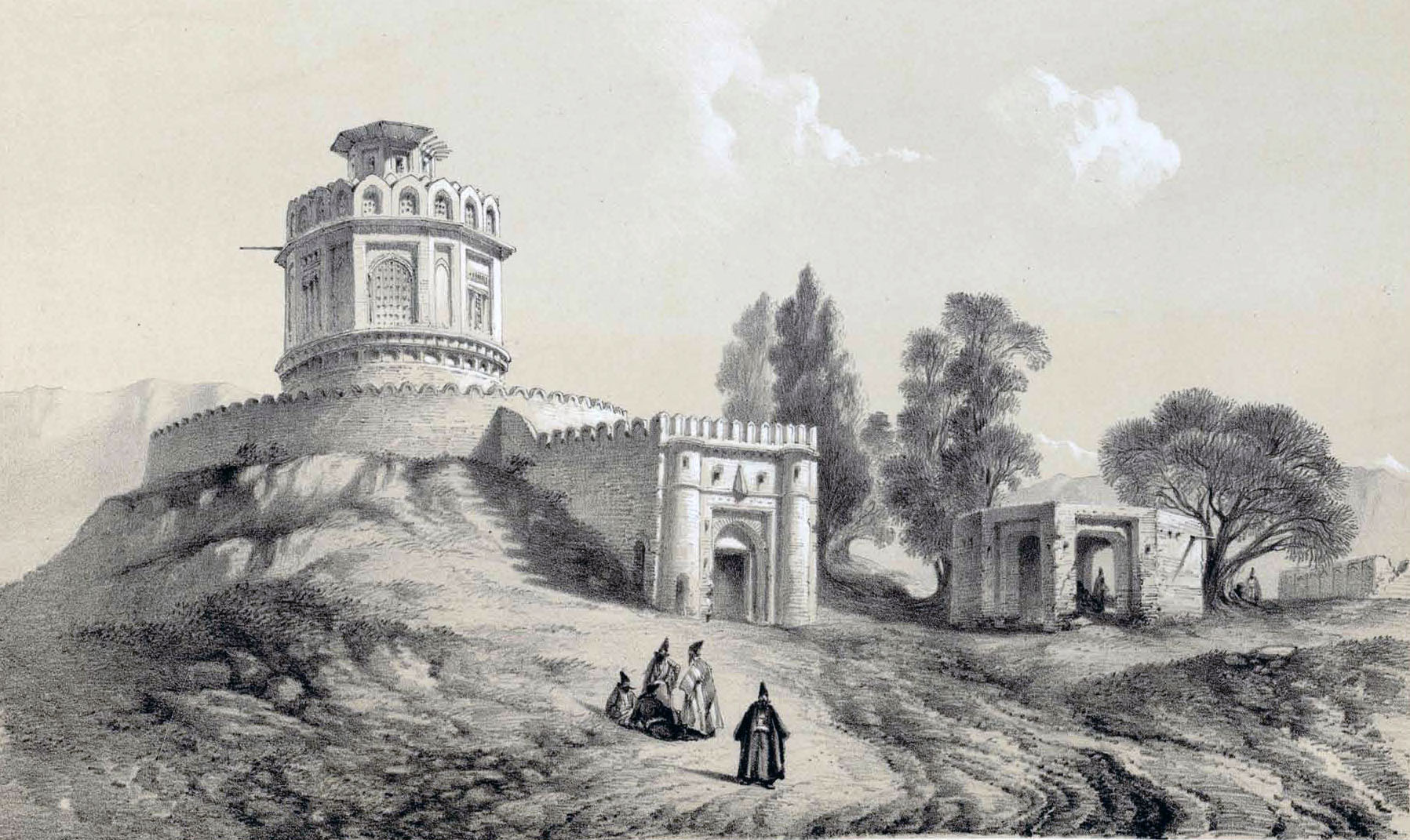
- An artist's impression of a gunpowder depot in northern Iran (19th century).
Date	1727–1728
Location	North eastern Iran
Result	Nader's victory: Tahmasp II of the Safavid dynasty becomes Nader's vassal
Territorial changes	Nader solidifies his hold on Khorasan and brings the south-eastern Caspian region under his dominion

Belligerents
Nader's Forces	Safavid dynasty

Commanders and leaders
Nader	Tahmasp II

Strength
Unknown	Unknown

Casualties and losses
Minimal	Minimal

The Sabzevar expedition was a politically decisive event in Nader's career where he in effect turned from mere commander-in-chief of Tahmasp II's forces into the real power behind the throne (although technically this still was a government in exile as the Gilzai Afghans were in control of Isfahan). The expedition was launched mainly due to Tahmasp's own incompetence and ill-thought attempt at curbing the powers of his upstart general and military genius.

== Prelude to Conflict ==
After the brief campaign in southern Khorasan that culminated in the battle of Sangan Nader was determined on a more ambitious plan of action which involved the taking of Herat in order to completely subdue the Abdali Afghans. He thus agreed with his Monarch Tahmasp II that they would invade southward were their paths would converge, leading to the final destination of Herat. Unfortunately for Nader (and for himself as events would later show) Tahmasp was increasingly distrustful, perhaps jealous of Nader and under the pressure of many in his entourage did not march southward but instead north where he proclaimed Nader a traitor and asked loyal subjects to join in the battle against him.

== Nader's Response ==
Nader's reaction was immediate. He left his brother in Mashad and set off with the bulk of his men and pursued Tahmasp north where the Shah was joined by the Qarachoorloo Kurds. The Shah was besieged by Nader in the fort "Kohne Sangan" where Nader brought up his guns to subject it to a heavy bombardment. The Kurds who came to relieve the Shah were lured into a ditch were Nader had concocted an elaborate trap in which he forced the Kurds into an ignominious surrender. Tahmasp cognisant of his precarious position sent a minister to negotiate with Nader. Nader claimed to be in fear of his life and when he was assured there was no cause for fear as the Tahmasp had given his word that no harm should befall him he mocked these guarantees mentioning that the Shah had also given his word that no harm would befall Fathali Khan but it only took a day before he was decapitated. Despite this he relented, alas for Tahmasp this did not entail a true return to kingship in any other way than in name, from this point he would function as Nader's stooge.

== Pacification of the North ==
After taming Tahmasp, Nader advanced on Astarabad, then further into Mazandaran bringing the southern coast of the Caspian sea under his control. He secured Khorasan from all quarters and now with a subservient monarch under his thumb he could advance onto Herat with both security as well as Royal legitimacy.

== See also ==
- Military of Afsharid Iran
- Kandahar
- Safavid dynasty
- Hotak dynasty
- Khorasan

== Sources ==
- Michael Axworthy, The Sword of Persia: Nader Shah, from Tribal Warrior to Conquering Tyrant Hardcover 348 pages (26 July 2006) Publisher: I.B. Tauris Language: English ISBN 1-85043-706-8
