= 1734 in the Ottoman Empire =

- Decades: 1710s; 1720s; 1730s; 1740s; 1750s
- See also: Other events of 1734; List of years in the Ottoman Empire

Events from the year 1734 in the Ottoman Empire.

== Incumbents ==
- Sultan – Mahmud I

== Events ==
- 3 November – As part of the Ottoman–Persian War, Safavid Iran started laying siege to the Ottoman city of Ganja.

=== Full dates unknown ===
- Claude Alexandre, a French convert serving the Ottoman Empire, attempted to found a school to train officers in the usage of modern artillery, but the project was obstructed by intervention from the Janissary.
- A printing press was constructed in Saint John's monastery in Khinshara, Ottoman Lebanon and started printing Christian texts in Arabic.
