= Siege of Baghdad (1733) =

Part of the Ottoman–Persian War (1730–1735)

- Part of the Ottoman–Persian War (1730–1735) and Nader's Campaigns
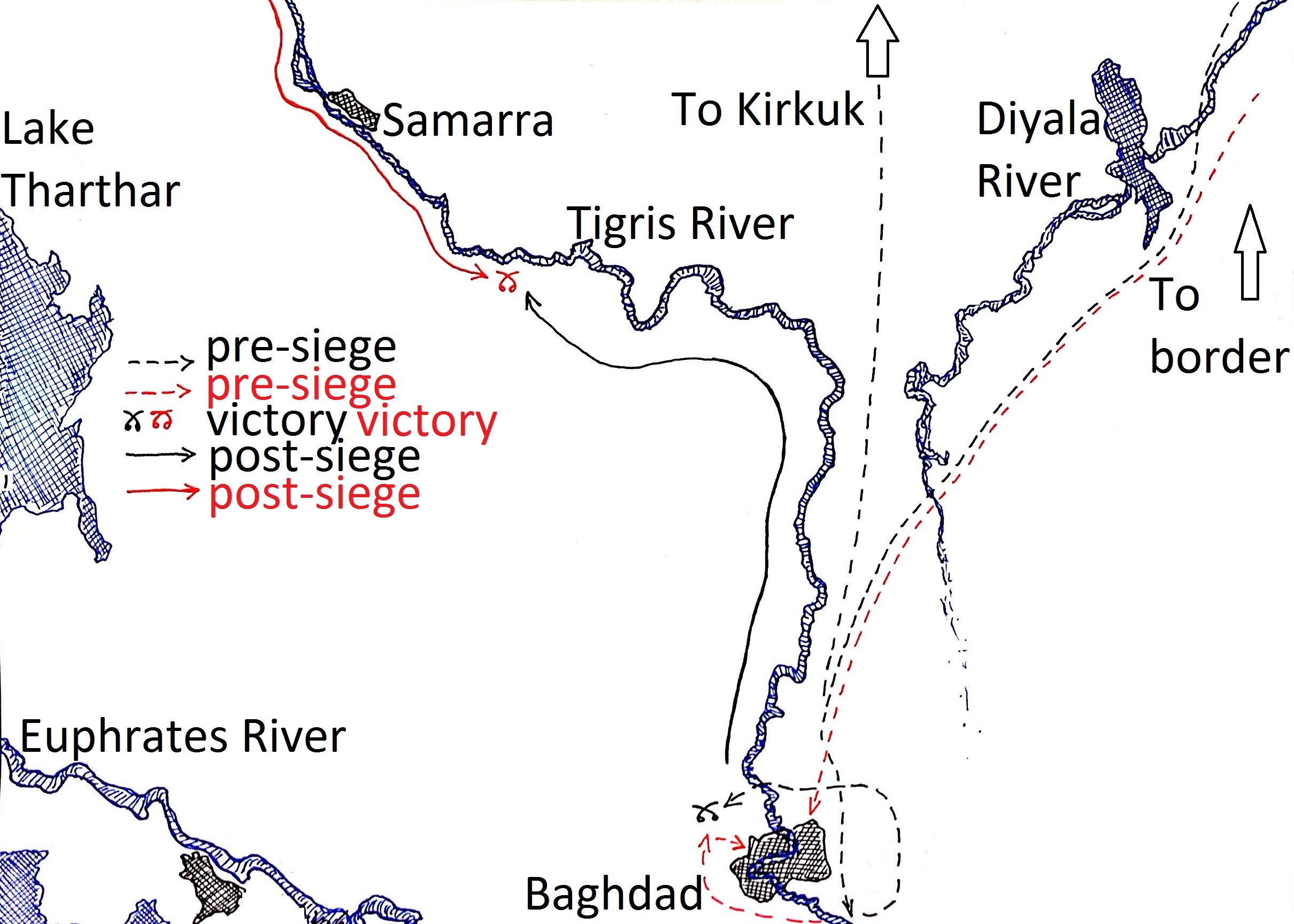
- The campaign in the Eyalat of Baghdad from Nader's invasion up to his defeat at Samara which resulted in the lifting of the siege of Baghdad.
Date	17 January 1733 – 24 July 1733
Location	Baghdad, Ottoman Iraq 33.32°N 44.42°E
Result	Ottoman victory

Belligerents
Safavid Iran	Ottoman Empire

Commanders and leaders
(Safavid Iran) Nader (Safavid Iran) Mohammad Khan	Ahmad Pasha; Topal Osman Pasha

Strength
100,000 or 80,000: 70,000 marched north to Samarra; 30,000 remained to maintain the siege	Unknown

Casualties and losses
Extremely heavy	Over 100,000 died due to disease and famine

The siege of Baghdad in 1733 was a relatively short but intense siege of Baghdad in Ottoman Iraq by the Persian army under Nader Shah. The outcome was determined not at Baghdad but ultimately far to the north near Samara where a large relief force commanded by the Topal Osman Pasha inflicted a decisive defeat on Nader's Persian army (the only battlefield defeat of Nader's career). The Persian besiegers were forced away.

== Commencement of the siege ==
Ahmad Pasha, the Mamluk ruler of Iraq, cautiously held to the left bank of the Tigris, knowing what a formidable barrier it posed to the invading Persian army. Nader camped on the east side and resorted to a ruse whereby he would fool the Ottomans by keeping a large portion of his men in and around the camp; but only to gather a small hand-picked group of soldiers to march north under the cover of night.

On February 15, Nader crossed the Tigris with 2,500 men and immediately moved south with another 1,500 men managing to make the crossing to follow Nader just before the bridge over the river collapsed into it. Ahmad Pasha accelerated his force up the Tigris as soon as he heard of the Persian contingent's presence on the left bank of the river. Nader's small band included three fowj of Kurdish (each "fowj" being a unit of 1,000 soldiers), Turcomen and Abdali Afghan troops which he formed up against a formidable Ottoman assault containing artillery, cavalry and janissaries (infantry).

The Turcomen and Kurds were driven back but the Abdali held long enough for the 1,500 men that crossed the Tigris before the collapse of the bridge to come from the north. Nader drew them up in formation and fed them into the battle, gradually pushing Ahmad pasha's line back until it was broken and the remnants fled towards Baghdad leaving many guns and corpses behind. Nader ordered some of the Kurds and Turcomen hanged for their cowardice in the face of danger and conversely rewarded the Abdali.

The environs of Baghdad were soon swarming with Persian soldiers as they joined their comrades from the east bank of the Tigris and began a colossal effort constructing 2,700 towers around the perimeter of the city. It is estimated that a total of 300,000 Persians were besieging the walls of Baghdad although just a 100,000 of them were soldiers.

== Topal Osman Pasha arrives ==
The outcome of the siege however was decided many miles to the north of Baghdad near a city called Samarra where Istanbul had sent the best army it could muster under the command of the best general it had: Topal Osman Pasha. Nader arrogantly marched north to attack the Ottoman relief force instead of choosing a suitable battlefield for a defensive battle. The result was one of the most bloody engagements of Nader's campaigns with almost half the Persian army becoming 'hors de combat' with even the Ottomans losing a quarter of their army leaving a terrifying 20,000 men as casualties of the debacle.

The battle was in fact so crushingly decisive that it forced the Persian from Iraq altogether, saving Baghdad from certain capture by Persia. Although Nader would make a miraculous comeback from his defeat, destroying Topal Pasha's army, he still failed to capture Baghdad in his subsequent campaign (mainly because of an insurrection in southern Persia which required his immediate presence).

== See also ==
- Battle of Samara
- Battle of Agh-Darband
- Topal Osman Pasha

== Sources ==
- Moghtader, Gholam-Hussein (2008). The Great Batlles of Nader Shah, Donyaye Ketab
- Axworthy, Michael (2009). The Sword of Persia: Nader Shah, from tribal warrior to conquering tyrant, I. B. Tauris ISBN 978-1-84511-982-9
- Ghafouri, Ali (2008). History of Iran's wars: from the Medes to now, Etela'at Publishing
