= Tahmasp Khan Jalayer =

- Born: Khorasan, Safavid Iran
- Died: 1747
- Cause of death: Assassination
- Military career
- Allegiance: Safavid Iran; Afsharid Iran
- Service years: 1720–1747
- Rank: Khan
- Conflicts: Naderian Wars; Caucasus campaign; Battle of Yeghevārd; Invasion of India; Battle of Karnal

Tahmasp Khan Jalayer (full name: Tahmasp Qoli Khan Jalayer; Persian: تهماسب قلی‌خان جلایر) was one of the most prominent and battle-hardened generals of the Naderian wars and served Nader Shah from the very early days of his military career in Khorasan until he was forced to rebel during the last year of Nader's reign as Shah.

In 1732 following Nader's coup and subsequent coronation of Abbas III in Isfahan, Tahmasp II's infant son as Shah, Tahmasp Khan Jalayer was appointed as governor of the city.

Tahmasp later accompanied Nader on his Caucasian Campaign against the Ottomans in 1735. On September 15, he defeated the Lezghis under Sorkhai Khan who had been assigned governorship over Shirvan at Deve Batan, and supported Nader in capturing Ganja.

Tahmasp Jalayer was present in many of the other key engagements of Nader's career and was instrumental in Reza Qoli Mirza Afshar's military successes against the Uzbeks. He and his protégé suppressed Afghan rebellions in Andkhui and Balkh before crossing the Oxus river and defeating an army of the Khanate of Bukhara near Qarshi. They later joined Nader's host at Kabul via Kunduz upon the invasion of India, while Reza Qoli Mirza Afshar was appointed viceroy of Iran.

He fought alongside Nader in the later Battle of Karnal where he commanded the right wing of the Iranian army.

During the last years of Nader's rule in Iran he was forced into rebellion as Nader, who at this point had begun to slip further into insanity and paranoia, declared him a traitor to test his loyalties. Adil Shah convinced him that open rebellion against Nader was the only solution but later Tahmasp Jalayer showed signs of wanting to be reconciled with Nader and so Adil Shah had him killed. The irony of his death was that he died as a loyal subject in open rebellion against a Shah who had forsaken him.

== Sources ==
- Axworthy, Michael (2009). The Sword of Persia: Nader Shah, from tribal warrior to conquering tyrant, I. B. Tauris
