= Battle of Nahavand (1730) =

Campaign of Nader Shah

- Part of the Ottoman–Persian War (1730–1735) and Western Iran campaign of 1730
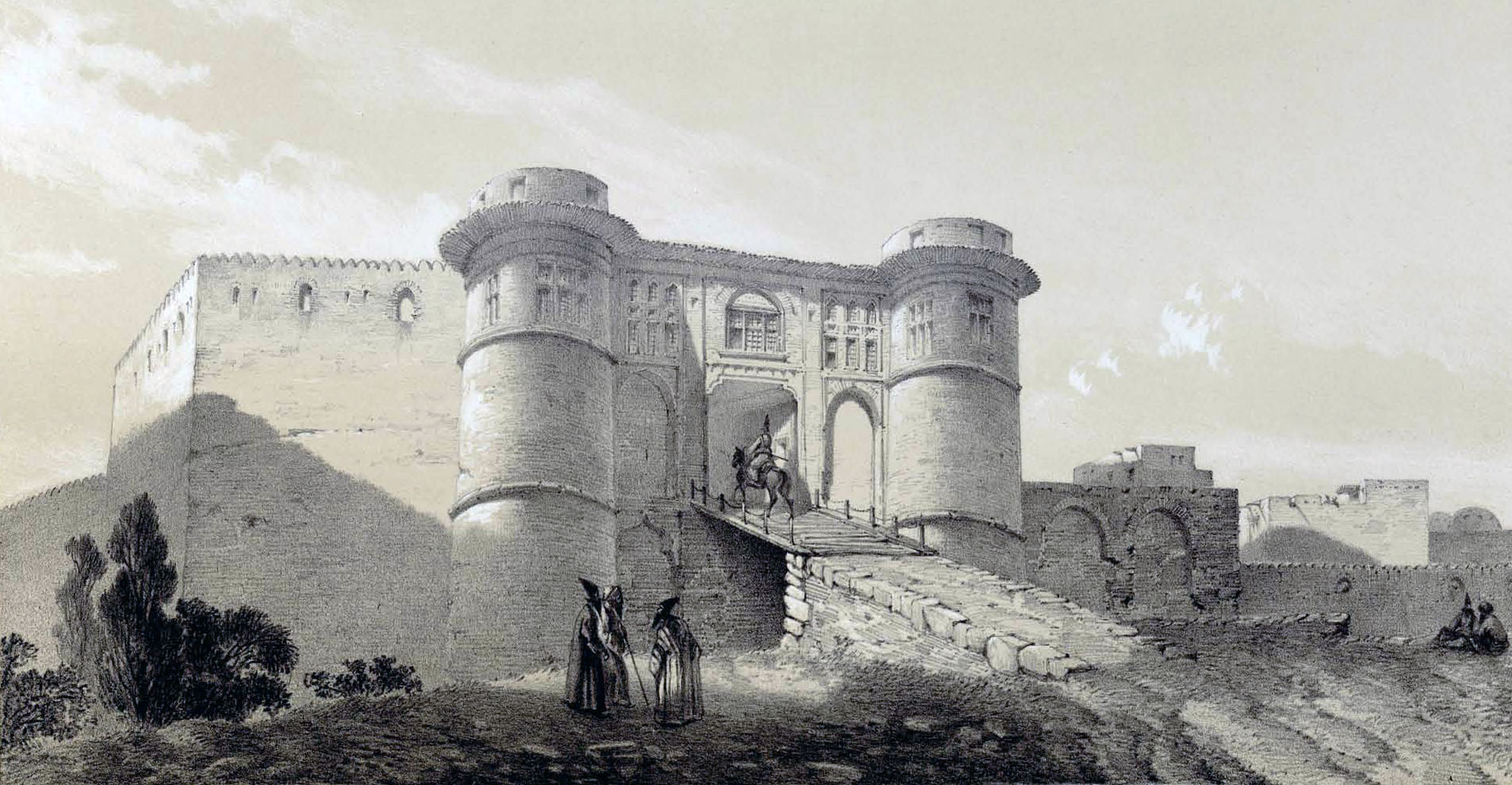
- "Castle Nahavend" (1840) by Eugène Flandin
Date	1 July, 1730
Location	Nahavand, Hamadan province
Result	Safavid victory
Territorial changes	Persian army recaptures Nahavand

Belligerents
Safavid Iran	Ottoman Empire

Commanders and leaders
(Safavid Iran) Nader Qoli	Osman Agha (POW)

Strength
6,000	2,000

Casualties and losses
None	1,500 soldiers massacred, 500 taken as captives. Ottoman army fled according to Axworthy's account. Or entire garrison was annihilated

The Battle of Nahavand (1730) (Persian: نبرد نهاوند) was a key military engagement in Nader Quli's Western Iran Campaign between the Ottoman Empire and Safavid Iran that resulted in the recapture of Nahavand by the Safavids.

== Background ==
The Ottoman and Russian armies had entered the western parts of Iran in the early 1720s to capitalize upon Mahmud Hotak's invasion of Iran in the east. However, this caused tension between the Ottomans and Russians. After lengthy negotiations between the Ottoman grand vizier and the Russian ambassador in Istanbul, with French mediation, a treaty for the partition of Persia was signed in 1724. The Ottoman-Russian treaty allowed both nations to recognize the military accomplishments made by both powers. By 1725, the Ottoman Empire had taken over western Iran and most of north-western Iran. In 1730, Nader Qoli would begin his first campaign against the Ottomans and the first military engagement would take place at Nahavand.

== Course of the engagement ==
Nader Qoli set out on his way to Nahavand from Burujird in July 1st of 1730 with a force of 6,000 soldiers, after a march that lasted a night, Nader subjugated the Ottoman garrison with a sudden attack. Nader Qoli massacred 1,500 out of the 2,000 Ottoman soldiers in the city and took the remaining 500 as captives alongside the warden, Osman Agha. According to Michael Axworthy's account, the Ottomans retaliated due to trusting their previous successes against the Persians. However the Ottomans were defeated and fled towards Hamedan.

== Aftermath ==
The victory led to the Ottomans regrouping in the valley of Malayer to prevent the Safavid advance upon Hamedan, where they were decisively defeated by Nader Qoli once more. Nader Qoli would soon enter Hamedan without any resistance.

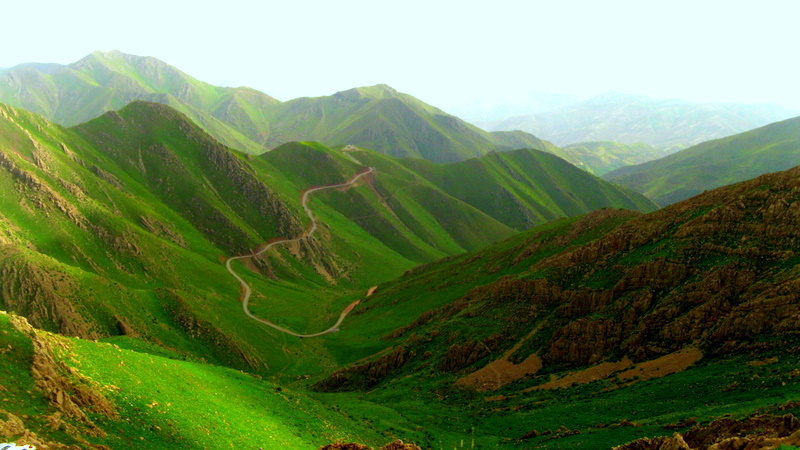
Kermanshah province, Iran

== See also ==
- Ottoman-Persian war (1730–1735)
- Western Iran campaign of 1730
- Nader Shah
- Military of Afsharid Iran
- Military of Safavid Iran

== Sources ==
- Axworthy, Michael (2009). The Sword of Persia: Nader Shah, from tribal warrior to conquering tyrant, I. B. Tauris ISBN 978-1-84511-982-9
- Mirza Mehdi Khan Astarabadi "Jahangosha-ye Naderi"
- Lockhart – Nadir Shah
- İskit, Server Rifat – Mufassal Osmanlı tarihi
- Ateş, Abdurrahman – Avşarlı Nadir Şah ve döneminde Osmanlı – İran mücadeleleri
- Karedeniz, Yılmaz – İran tarihi: (1700–1925)
- Farrokh, Kaveh – Iran at War: 1500–1988
