= 1733 =

1733 in various calendars
- Gregorian calendar: 1733; MDCCXXXIII
- Ab urbe condita: 2486
- Armenian calendar: 1182; ԹՎ ՌՃՁԲ
- Assyrian calendar: 6483
- Balinese saka calendar: 1654–1655
- Bengali calendar: 1139–1140
- Berber calendar: 2683
- British Regnal year: 6 Geo. 2 – 7 Geo. 2
- Buddhist calendar: 2277
- Burmese calendar: 1095
- Byzantine calendar: 7241–7242
- Chinese calendar: 壬子年 (Water Rat); 4430 or 4223 — to — 癸丑年 (Water Ox); 4431 or 4224
- Coptic calendar: 1449–1450
- Discordian calendar: 2899
- Ethiopian calendar: 1725–1726
- Hebrew calendar: 5493–5494
- Hindu calendars
- Vikram Samvat: 1789–1790
- Shaka Samvat: 1654–1655
- Kali Yuga: 4833–4834
- Holocene calendar: 11733
- Igbo calendar: 733–734
- Iranian calendar: 1111–1112
- Islamic calendar: 1145–1146
- Japanese calendar: Kyōhō 18 (享保１８年)
- Javanese calendar: 1657–1658
- Julian calendar: Gregorian minus 11 days
- Korean calendar: 4066
- Minguo calendar: 179 before ROC 民前179年
- Nanakshahi calendar: 265
- Thai solar calendar: 2275–2276
- Tibetan calendar: ཆུ་ཕོ་བྱི་བ་ལོ་ (male Water-Rat); 1859 or 1478 or 706 — to — ཆུ་མོ་གླང་ལོ་ (female Water-Ox); 1860 or 1479 or 707

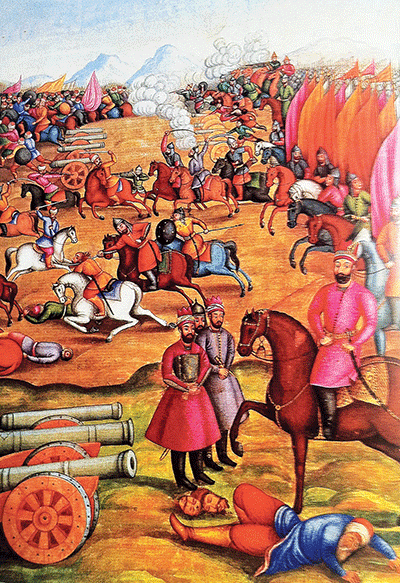
October 24: Persian Empire and Ottoman Empire fight the Battle of Kirkuk.

1733 (MDCCXXXIII) was a common year starting on Thursday of the Gregorian calendar and a common year starting on Monday of the Julian calendar, the 1733rd year of the Common Era (CE) and Anno Domini (AD) designations, the 733rd year of the 2nd millennium, the 33rd year of the 18th century, and the 4th year of the 1730s decade. As of the start of 1733, the Gregorian calendar was 11 days ahead of the Julian calendar, which remained in localized use until 1923.

== Events ==
=== January–March ===
- January 13 – Borommarachathirat V becomes King of Siam (now Thailand) upon the death of King Sanphet IX.
- January 27 – George Frideric Handel's classic opera, Orlando is performed for the first time, making its debut at the King's Theatre in London.
- February 12 – British colonist James Oglethorpe founds Savannah, Georgia.
- March 21 – The Molasses Act is passed by British House of Commons, which reinforces the negative opinions of the British by American colonists. The Act then goes to the House of Lords, which consents to it on May 4 and it receives royal assent on May 17.
- March 25 – English replaces Latin and Law French as the official language of English and Scottish courts following the enforcement of the Proceedings in Courts of Justice Act 1730.

=== April–June ===
- April 6
  - After British Prime Minister Robert Walpole's proposed excise tax bill results in rioting over the imposition of additional taxes and the use of government agents to collect them, Walpole informs the House of Commons that he will withdraw the legislation.
  - Royal Colony of North Carolina Commissioners John Watson, Joshua Grainger, Michael Higgins and James Wimble begin selling lots for the town of New Carthage (which is later renamed and is now Wilmington, North Carolina), on the east side of the Cape Fear River.
- May 1 – The canton system is first introduced in Prussia.
- May 17 – The Molasses Act receives royal assent and begins to go into effect on June 24.
- May 26 – The introduction of John Kay's Flying Shuttle which revolutionized the textile industry and marked the beginning of the Industrial Revolution.
- May 29 – The right of Canadians to keep Indian slaves is upheld at Quebec.
- June 12 – At Schloss Salzdahlum, Prince Frederick of Prussia, the 21-year-old heir to the throne reluctantly marries Duchess Elisabeth Christine of Brunswick-Bevern in order to avoid prosecution for desertion from the Prussian Army and to be guaranteed the throne. Despite the unhappy marriage Frederick and Elisabeth later reign as King and Queen Consort of Prussia.
- June 15 – The Danish West India Company buys the island of Saint Croix from France for 750,000 livres.

=== July–September ===
- July 15 – A hurricane off of the coast of the Florida Keys wrecks at least 17 Spanish ships.
- July 30 – The first Freemasons lodge, the Grand Lodge of Massachusetts, opens in what will become the United States of America.
- August 19 – In Warsaw as Stanislas Leszczynski appears to be on the verge of being elected King of Poland, Russia, Austria and Saxony sign Löwenwolde's Treaty (named for Russian diplomat Karl Gustav von Löwenwolde), pledging to go to war to place Frederick Augustus, son of the late King Augustus II, on the throne.
- September 12 – Stanislas Leszczynski, who had been King of Poland from 1704 to 1709 until being driven from the throne by King Augustus II, is returned to office by the vote of the Sejm. Russia and Austria protest the election, since King Stanislaus is backed by France and Sweden.
- September 26 – The Treaty of Turin is signed in Turin as a secret agreement between King Louis XV of France and King Charles Emmanuel III of Sardinia.

=== October–December ===
- October 5 – The election of Augustus III, to succeed his father as King of Poland, sparks the War of the Polish Succession.
- October 10 – France declares war on Austria and Saxony.
- October 24 – The Battle of Kirkuk starts which will lead to the defeat of the Ottoman army under general Topal Osman Pasha.
- November 23 – The 1733 slave insurrection on St. John begins: Slaves from Akwamu rebel against their owners in the Danish West Indies.
- December 19 – Unsuccessful in capturing Baghdad from the Ottoman Empire, Persia's ruler Nader Shah signs the Treaty of Baghdad with the Ottoman Governor, Ahmad Khan Pasha, with the Turks and the Iranians agreeing to restore the boundary between the two empires to the lines before the 1732 Ottoman invasion of Iran.
- December 25 – The Molasses Act goes into full effect.

== Births ==
- January 22 – Philip Carteret, Jersey-born British naval officer and circumnavigator (d. 1796)
- January 24 – Benjamin Lincoln, major general in the Continental Army during the American Revolutionary War, and politician (d. 1810)

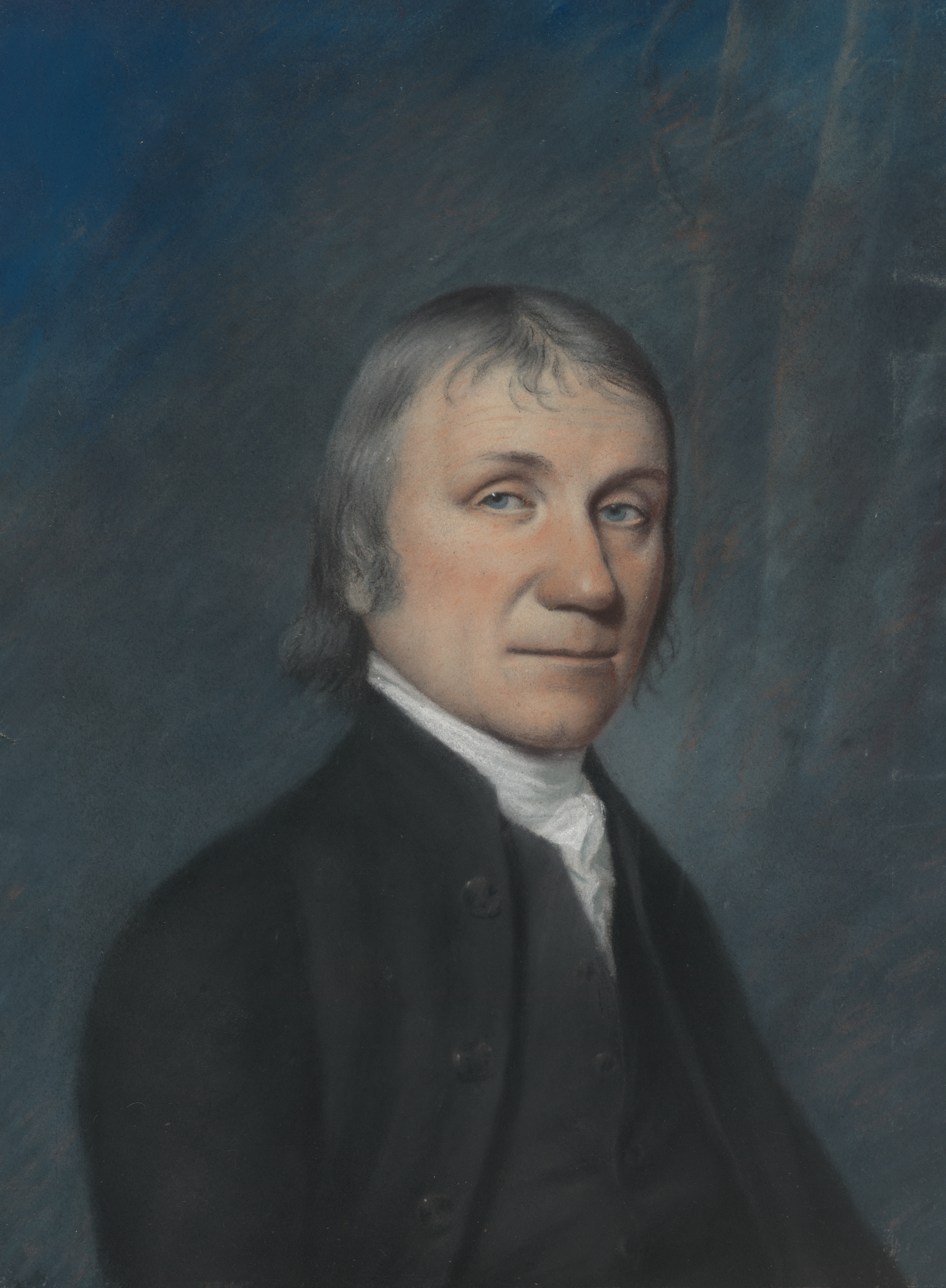
Joseph Priestley

- March 13 – Joseph Priestley, English scientist and minister (d. 1804)
- May 4 – Jean-Charles de Borda, French mathematician, physicist, political scientist, and sailor (d. 1799)
- July 27 – Jeremiah Dixon, English surveyor and astronomer (d. 1779)
- September 5 – Christoph Martin Wieland, German poet and writer (d. 1813)
- September 18 – George Read, American lawyer and signer of the Declaration of Independence (d. 1798)
- October 14 – François Sébastien Charles Joseph de Croix, Count of Clerfayt, Austrian field marshal (d. 1798)
- October 15 – Lisa Eriksdotter, Finnish visionary
- November 16 – Siraj ud-Daulah, the last independent ruler of Bengal of undivided India (d. 1757)
- November 20 – Philip Schuyler, general in the American Revolution, United States Senator from New York, father of Angelica Schuyler Church and Elizabeth Schuyler Hamilton (d. 1804)
- undated – Johanna Löfblad, Swedish actor and singer (d. 1811)

== Deaths ==
- January 17 – George Byng, 1st Viscount Torrington, English Royal Navy admiral (b. 1663)
- January 21 – Bernard Mandeville, Dutch-born English economic philosopher (b. 1670)
- January 22 – Lovisa von Burghausen, Swedish memoirist (b. 1698)
- January 25 – Gilbert Heathcote, Mayor of London (b. 1652)
- January 27 – Thomas Woolston, English theologian (b. 1668)

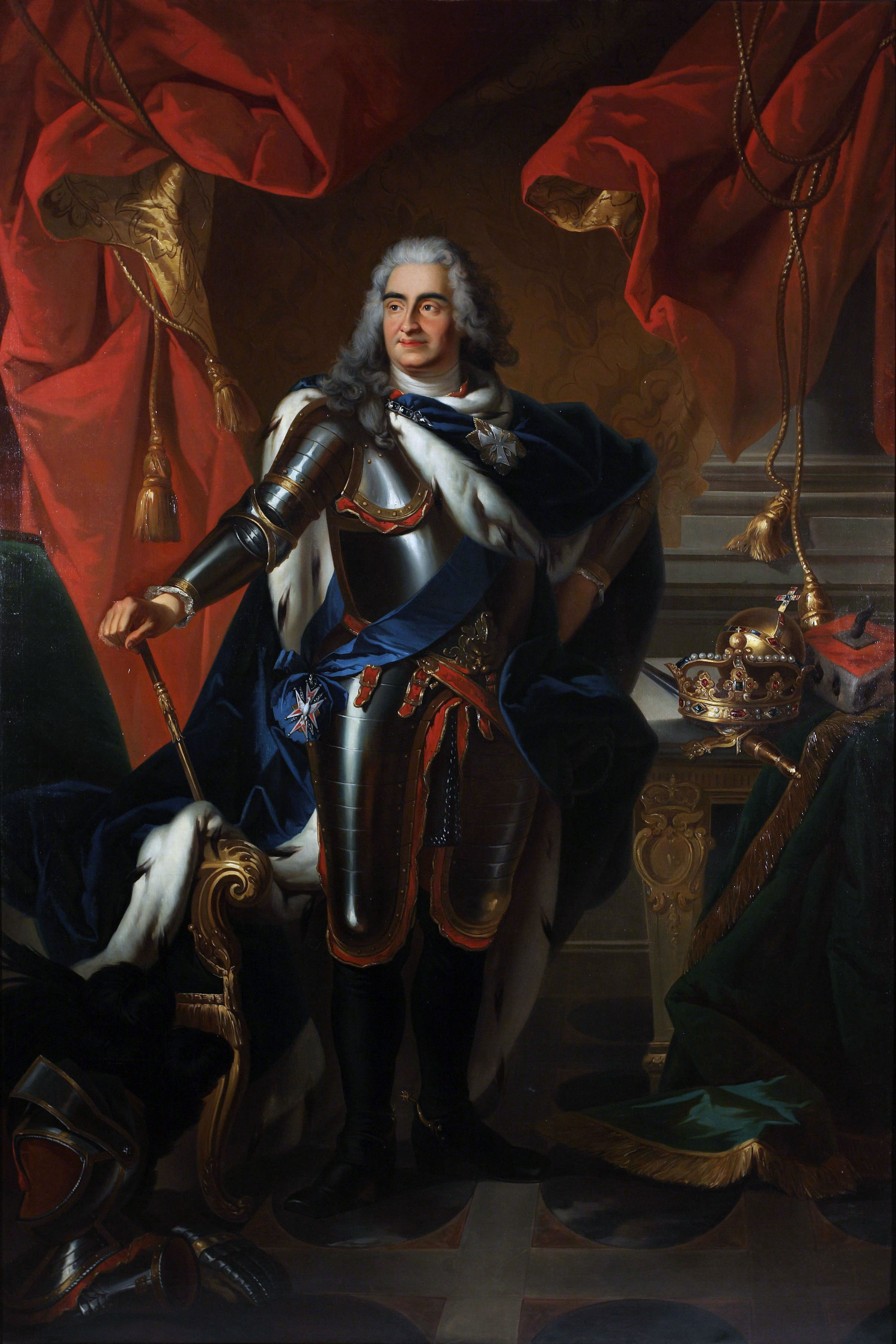
Augustus II the Strong

- February 1 – King Augustus II the Strong of Poland (b. 1670)
- February 2 – Robert Price (judge), British judge and politician (b. 1653)
- February 16 – Ulrika Eleonora Stålhammar, Swedish officer (b. 1683)
- March 4 – Claude de Forbin, French naval commander (b. 1656)
- April 14 – Ippolito Desideri, Italian tibetologist (b. 1684)
- April 19 – Elizabeth Hamilton, Countess of Orkney, mistress of William III of England (b. 1657)
- April 30 – Rodrigo Anes de Sá Almeida e Meneses, 1st Marquis of Abrantes, Portuguese diplomat (b. 1676)
- May 1 – Nicolas Coustou, French artist (b. 1658)
- May 3 – Sir Richard Cox, 1st Baronet, England (b. 1650)
- May 10 – Barton Booth, English actor (b. 1681)
- May 18 – Georg Böhm, German organist (b. 1661)
- June 23 – Johann Jakob Scheuchzer, Swiss scholar (b. 1672)
- July 12 – Anne-Thérèse de Marguenat de Courcelles, French salon holder (b. 1647)
- August 16 – Matthew Tindal, English deist (b. 1657)
- August 24 – Pierre-Étienne Monnot, French artist (b. 1657)
- September 12 – François Couperin, French composer (b. 1668)
- October 19 – Sir Thomas Molyneux, 1st Baronet, Irish politician (b. 1661)
- October 25 – Giovanni Girolamo Saccheri, Italian mathematician (b. 1667)
- October 31 – Eberhard Louis, Duke of Württemberg, (b. 1676)
- November 11 – Willem Adriaan van der Stel, Dutch colonial administrator (b. 1664)
- December 2 – Gerard Hoet, Dutch painter (b. 1648)
