= Battle of Samarra (1733) =

Part of the Ottoman-Persian war (1730–35)

- Part of the Ottoman–Persian War (1730–1735)
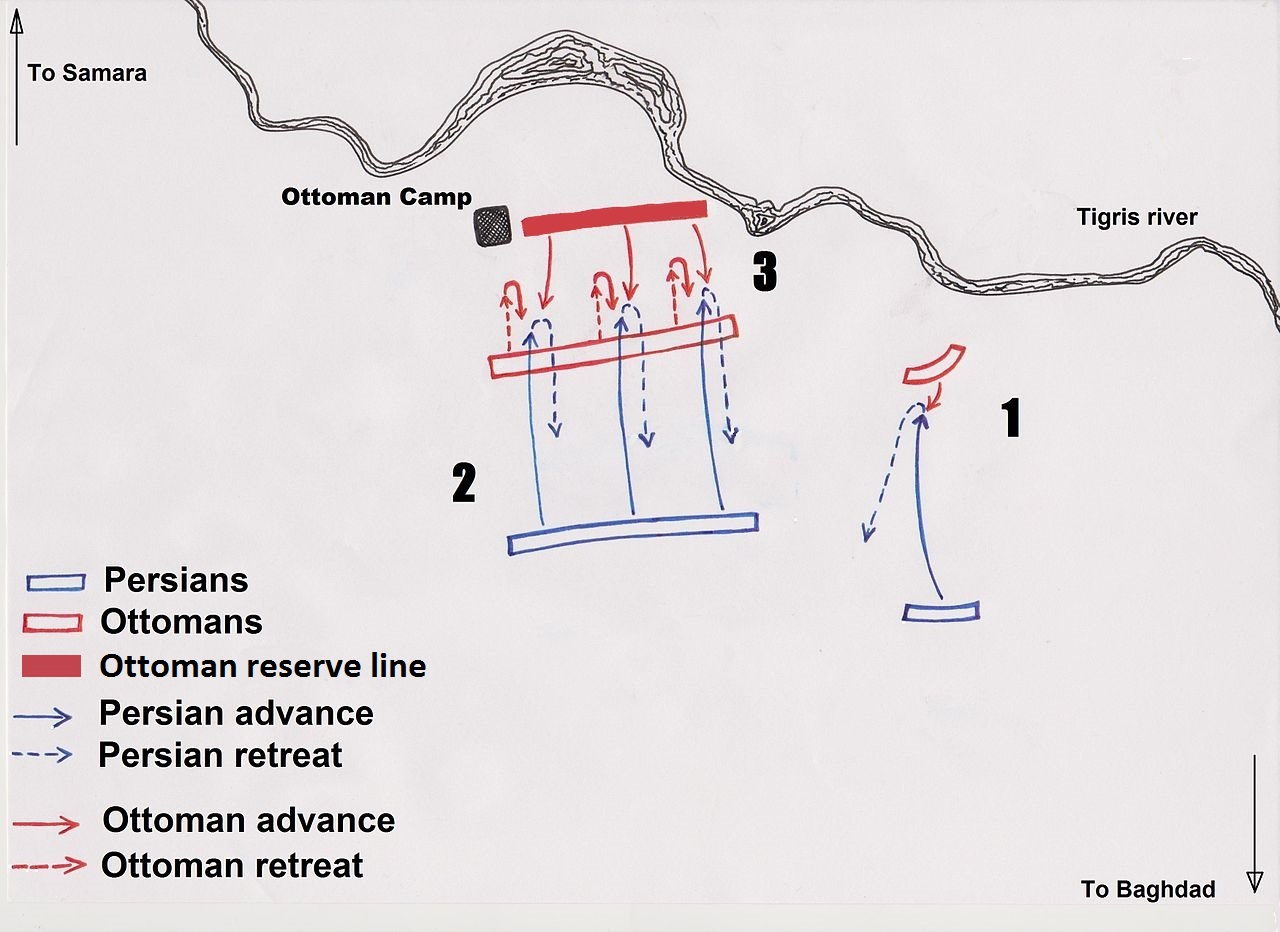
- 1 Nader fails to gain an advantage on the Ottoman left due to Topal Pasha's hidden reinforcements which arrived secretly the night before 2 Nader, frustrated by this failure, forms up the core of his army and unleashes an overpowering onslaught on the main Ottoman line pushing the Turks back to very near their encampments 3 Topal Pasha brings forth his reserve line of 20,000 men and restores the situation by driving the Persians back. A brutally intense fight develops with the momentum of the battle swinging like a pendulum in both directions until the Persian army's morale collapses leaving the Ottomans as the clear yet bloodied victors.
Date	July 19, 1733
Location	Baghdad Vilayet, Ottoman Iraq
Result	Ottoman victory
Territorial changes	The Siege of Baghdad is lifted and Ottoman Iraq remains under Turkish rule

Belligerents
Safavid Iran	Ottoman Empire

Commanders and leaders
Nader	Topal Osman Pasha

Strength
70,000 to 80,000: few score cannon & zamburaks	80,000: 60 cannon

Casualties and losses
30,000; 3,000 captured 500 executed all the cannon & zamburaks	20,000

The Battle of Samarra was the key engagement between the two great generals Nader Shah and Topal Osman Pasha, which led to the siege of Baghdad being lifted, keeping Ottoman Iraq under Istanbul's control. The armed contest between the two colossi was very hard fought, with a total of roughly 50,000 men becoming casualties by the end of the fighting that left the Persians decimated and the Ottoman victors badly shaken. Other than its importance in deciding the fate of Baghdad, the battle is also significant as Nader's only battlefield defeat although he would avenge this defeat at the hands of Topal Pasha at the Battle of Kirkuk, where Topal was killed.

== Siege of Baghdad and the arrival of Topal Pasha ==
Nader had besieged Baghdad with a mighty force of 100,000 fighting men. Constructing towers and trenches all around the city they had placed Baghdad in an iron ring forcing Ahmad Pasha to consider surrender. As negotiations began, Ahmad Pasha was brought news that the greatest general of the empire and former Vizier Topal Osman Pasha had been appointed commander-in-chief of an army of 80,000 men mostly high quality janissaries and sipahi from Istanbul along with 80 guns was marching from the north to relieve Baghdad.

Topal Osman would prove a radically different opponent than any other Nader had faced, yet Nader by now had been victorious so many times that he had perhaps come to believe himself invincible. Leaving 12,000 men behind to enforce the siege he marched north towards Samarra taking with him 70,000 men and dozens of guns.

=== Difficulties at Baghdad ===
Nader had also started to divert much of the water streaming into Baghdad in the hope of applying further pressure to the inhabitants, who would in turn conceivably pressure Ahmad Pasha to hand over control of the city and put an end to their privations. This however failed to materialise although an estimated sixty thousand civilians and non military persons lost their lives due to the ruthless implementation of the blockade.

The Persian artillery proved unequal to the task of puncturing the city's stalwart fortifications as it mostly consisted of field artillery- Nader's army at this point lacked any significant siege guns. The only hope for the city's capture was a prolonged starvation of its inhabitants which was going to be an incredibly exacting quest as Baghdad was a huge city with a governor fully aware that the loss of his Eyalat would mean the permanent loss of power as he would almost certainly not be compensated with another.

=== Topal Osman ===
Topal Osman hailed from Anatolia originally although he was born and raised in the Peloponesse peninsula of Morea. He entered the service of the sultan as a youth and by the age of 24 had risen to the rank of Beylerbey. He was later sent to Egypt though his ship was attacked en route and he was taken to Malta as a prisoner. He was ransomed and released, later partaking in the Pruth River Campaign, which saw Peter the Great decisively beaten, as well as playing a major role in the war with Venice where he particularly distinguished himself, so much so that he was rewarded with the title of Pasha.

Topal eventually rose to the rank of grand vizier of the Ottoman Empire, though he held this title for only six months before being dismissed due to political wrangling in the capital. By the time he was appointed 'saraskar' of the Ottoman army sent to face Nader he was the seventy-year-old governor of the Trebizond & Tiflis Eyalats.

== Battle of Samarra ==
Topal proved his worth almost immediately. To provoke a bellicose attack by Nader he weakened his advance and rear guards visibly but during the night reinforced them significantly. Nader sent a large body of his cavalry to assault the Ottoman left but this was beaten back as the Ottomans were greater in number than initially thought and had deployed artillery. Nader decided on bringing forth a bulk of his army consisting of some 50,000 men and break the Ottomans using a frontal assault. After an intense collision of troops the Ottoman centre was pushed all the way back to the edge of their tents and encampments with some of their guns falling into Persian hands. At this juncture the flight of 2,000 Kurds in the Ottoman army put Topal Osman's men in a near-impossible situation but he restored the situation by providing an extra 20,000 soldiers from his reserve which succeeded in pushing the Persian back and even recapturing the guns lost earlier.

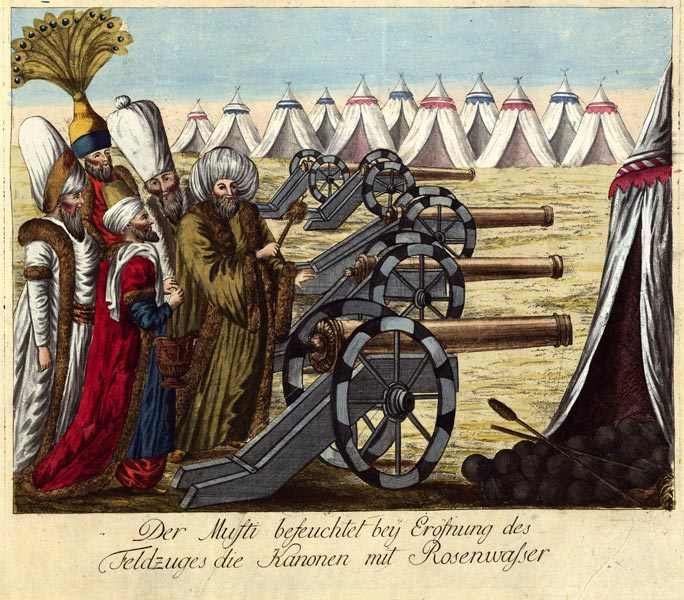
Ottoman Army artillerymen.

The battle continued with both armies continually gaining and losing ground from one another till noon. Due to the wise positioning of the Ottoman army in this campaign by Topal Pasha his men had access to water from the Tigris river behind them while the Persians grew increasingly thirsty as the battle raged on well into the blistering heat of the Mesopotamian afternoon with no immediate source to provide much needed succour. The strength of Topal Pasha's positioning also showed another great advantage as at this point the wind started to blow south kicking up dust and sand into the faces of the Persians which was now coupled by a further misfortune - a betrayal by an Arab tribal contingent in Nader's army - all culminating in a critical state of affairs which could prove too much, even for the battle-hardened troops of Nader.

Not even the commitment of a 12,000 strong reserve of Abdali cavalry could break the janissaries, merely adding to the mayhem as they were also swept up in the vortex of bloody carnage that had now become the battle of Samarra. As the army began to disintegrate under so much pressure, Nader rode around encouraging his men to further efforts and partook in the fighting personally, managing to skewer an Ottoman cavalryman with a lance but was himself thrown from his horse in the violent scuffle. Rumours spread through the Persian ranks of Nader's demise, dealing a death blow to the morale of an already exhausted army. As organized resistance began to fade after an unrelenting 9 hour engagement the Persians withdrew south and could not be rallied despite the best efforts of their leaders. Nader had for the first and last time in his monumental career of conquest been defeated. The two great leaders had battled their men with unbelievable ferocity, but Topal Pasha had managed, if only just, to carry the day by winning a costly yet still glorious and decisive victory.

== Aftermath ==
The Persians lost almost half their entire force including all of their artillery pieces many of which fell into Ottoman hands: 30,000 killed & wounded with a further 3,500 captured (500 of them executed). The Ottomans however were also badly mauled losing a quarter of their men in the battle. The victory, however heavy the price accompanying it might have been, brought an end to the siege of Baghdad as Ahmad Pasha and his men - their morale buoyed by news of Topal Pasha's illustrious triumph to the north - burst out of the city gates to cut down as many of the besiegers as they could and put the rest to flight. On July 24, 1733 Topal Osman Pasha marched his men into Baghdad in triumph.

== See also ==
- Military of the Afsharid dynasty of Persia
- Ottoman–Persian War (1730–1735)
- Caucasus Campaign (1735)

== Sources ==
- Moghtader, Gholam-Hussein(2008). The Great Batlles of Nader Shah, Donyaye Ketab
- Axworthy, Michael(2009). The Sword of Persia: Nader Shah, from tribal warrior to conquering tyrant, I. B. Tauris
- Ghafouri, Ali(2008). History of Iran's wars: from the Medes to now, Etela'at Publishing
