= Western Iran campaign of 1730 =

Nader Shah's invasion of the Ottoman Empire to reclaim formerly Persian lands

Western Iran campaign
- Part of the Ottoman–Persian War (1730–1735) and Naderian Wars
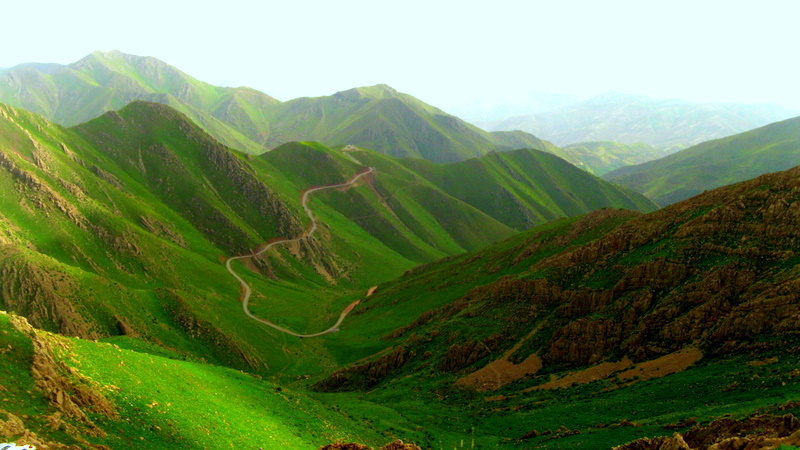
- Western Iran, Kermanshah Province
Date	March – August 1730
Location	Western Iran
Result	Safavid victory
Territorial changes	Western Iran regained from the Ottoman Empire

Belligerents
Safavid Iran	Ottoman Empire

Commanders and leaders
(Safavid Iran) Nader	Osman Pasha; Suleiman Pasha; Timur Pasha (WIA)

Strength
30,000: 25,000 at the outset; 5,000 joined later from Qazvin	45,000+: 15,000 at Nahavand; 30,000 at Malayer

Casualties and losses
Unknown	Heavy: A large portion of the Ottoman cannon and baggage

Nader's Western Iran campaign of 1730 was his first against perhaps his most formidable of adversaries, namely the Ottomans, where he proved triumphant in conquest. The great successes of his expedition, however, were rendered null when Shah Tahmasp II decided to take personal command of the theatre in Nader's absence, forcing a furious Nader to return and rectify the situation after forcing Tahmasp's abdication in favour of his infant son Abbas III.

== The Ottoman occupation ==
The Ottomans had entered the western regions of the country in the early 1720s when the Hotak invasion of Mahmud Hotak was launched against the Safavid Empire. In a decisive engagement near Gulnabad, Mahmud Hotak managed a surprising victory against a far greater (though severely divided) Iranian army. The route of the imperial army allowed him to march on the capital Isfahan which he captured after a 6-month siege that caused unheard misery and loss of life in the city. During the chaos of the Safavid overthrow, the Russian and the Ottoman empires seized on this opportunity to annex as much land as they could with Ottomans taking western Iran and dividing the Caucasus up with the Russians.

Soon the Hotak conquerors installed a new leader as shah through a coup de'tat in which Mahmud was replaced with his cousin, Ashraf Hotak. Ashraf marched west to put a halt to any further expansion by the Ottomans and to the surprise of many defeated them. The diplomatic outcome however was very much reconciliatory as the Ottomans promised recognition of Ashraf as the legitimate Shah of Iran in exchange for Ashraf's acknowledgement of Ottoman rule in their new territories in the Caucasus and western Iran.

As Nader and Ashraf came head-to-head in a conflict that would decide the fate of the country, the Ottomans wisely supported Ashraf against the Safavid loyalists as a resurgent Iran under an ambitious and talented general who would be flushed with the success of conquest would not bode well for the Ottomans hold on their newly acquired provinces. Despite support from the Turks, Nader still managed to completely destroy Ashraf's forces in numerous engagements which led to re-establishing the Safavid state under the nominal rule of Tahmasp II. Istanbul's fears had been realised as Nader would certainly turn to liberating the lost territories of the empire. The Ottomans however had been present in the west of the country for close to a decade and would prove a very formidable challenge to any efforts at their expulsion from what now formed the eastern boundaries of their empire.

== Nader marches on Nahavand ==
On 9 March 1730, the Iranian army left Shiraz and in a leisurely manner celebrated the new year (Nowruz), after which Nader commenced a rapid forced march westward in the hope of catching the Ottomans off balance. Reaching the Ottoman-occupied town of Nahavand via Lorestan, Nader put the Turks here to flight towards Hamadan, where, recovering from their initial shock and panic, they regrouped and presented themselves in the valley of Malayer to give battle in the hope of ending Nader's advance on Hamadan.

== The Battle of Malayer Valley ==
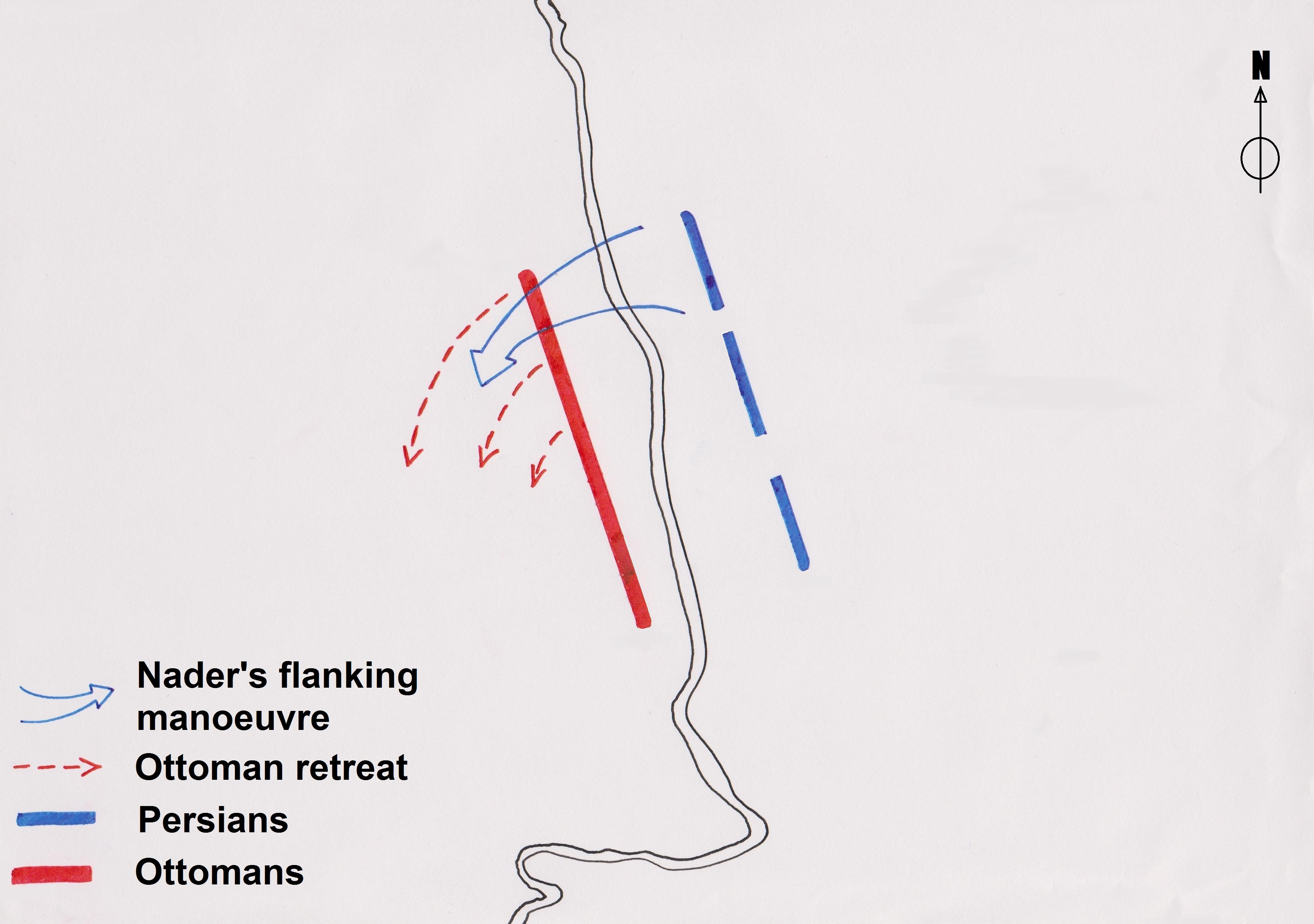
a military diagram of the battle of Malayer valley

The Ottoman force of ~30.000 men arrayed in front of the 25.000 men strong Iranian army, which was of a different nature altogether from all the previous foes the Iranian army had faced up to this point. Nader's Afghan and tribal opponents had been almost completely devoid of any infantry or artillery units (excluding Murche-Khort), comprised almost exclusively of excellent mounted warriors instead.

Now Nader faced an adversary who in many respects mirrored the Iranian army's own composition in structure as well as constituent unit types. The Turks had drawn themselves up parallel to a stream flowing through the valley, on the other side of which Nader deployed his men into three separate divisions, placing himself in the centre. As the two armies came within musket range of each other, a general fire broke out along the entire length of the line, with the smoke created from the muskets & cannon dancing over the shallow body of water separating the two armies, obscuring the Iranians and Ottomans from each other's view. Nader, under this veil of smoke, started strengthening and preparing his right wing for a bold gamble.

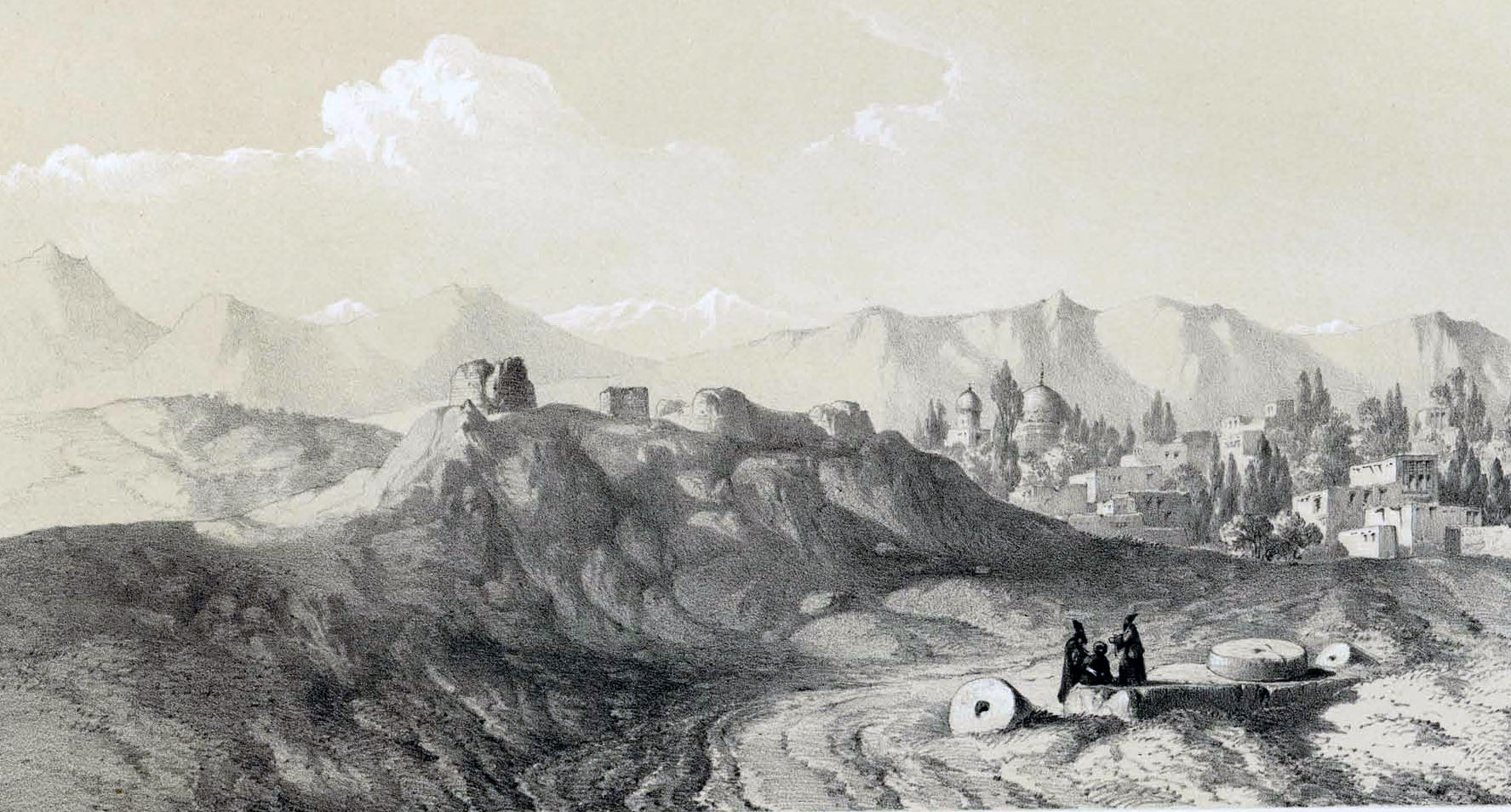
The battle of Malayer Valley opened the road to Hamadan

Nader gave the order for a sudden thrust by his right flank across the stream. The Iranians appeared from the billowing cloud of smoke that had concealed their advance and threw the Ottomans, who were dazzled by the unexpected appearance of the enemy seemingly out of thin air, into disarray. An intense few hours of fighting followed, with the Ottomans attempting to salvage their left to no avail. The onslaught of the Iranian right cut further into the flesh of the Turk's left wing and the killing of the chief Ottoman Bannerman caused a much demoralised army to turn tail and flee, with the Iranian cavalry in pursuit cutting down and imprisoning a large number of men. A clear victory was won, opening the road to Hamadan for Nader's troops.

== Nader pivots north ==
After liberating Hamadan along with its 10,000 imprisoned Iranian soldiers, Nader gained Kermanshah, thus liberating large swathes of western Iran from Ottoman rule. Leaving behind a fortified position, he now moved his army to Azerbaijan, where he took Tabriz on 12 August, crushing an army sent (too late) to reinforce Tabriz. The Turkish prisoners were treated kindly, with Nader freeing many of the Pashas, dispatching them with messages of peace to Constantinople (Istanbul). In a lightning campaign Nader had reincorporated all the main provinces of the Iranian heartland.

== See also ==
- Military of Afsharid Iran
- Ottoman–Persian War (1730–1735)
- Tahmasp II's campaign of 1731
- Military history of Iran
- Ottoman–Persian Wars
