= Caucasus campaign of 1734–1735 =

Part of the Ottoman-Safavid war (1730-35)

Caucasus Campaign
- Part of the Ottoman–Persian War (1730–1735) and Naderian Wars
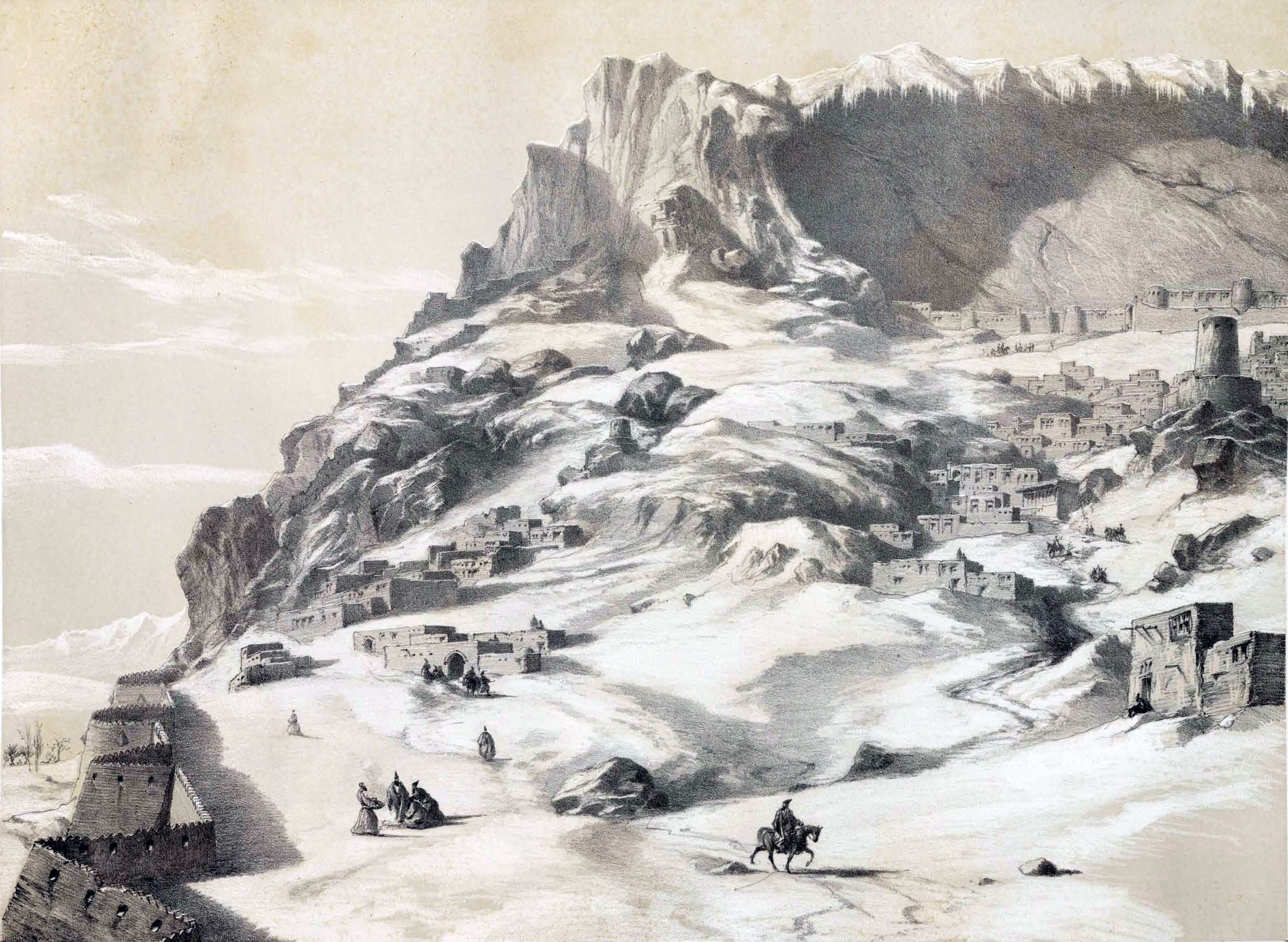
- An artist's illustration of an Armenian-Persian border town in the Caucasus
| Date | 1734–1735 |
| Location | Caucasus |
| Result | Safavid victory (effective end of the war) |
| Territorial changes | Persian suzerainty re-established over the Caucasus |

Belligerents
| Safavid Iran; Erivan Khanate | Ottoman Empire; Crimean Khanate; Lezgis; Avar Khanate |

Commanders and leaders
| Nader Shah; Tahmasp Khan Jalayer | Köprülü Abdullah Pasha †; Surkhay I (AWOL); Ahmad Khan; Sorkhai of Avaria |

Casualties and losses
| Minimal | 50,000+ killed & wounded |

The Caucasus Campaign of 1734–1735 (Persian: کارزار قفقاز) was the last great campaign of the Ottoman–Persian War (1730–1735) which ended in a Persian victory allowing Nader to recast Persian hegemony over almost the entire Caucasus, region, reconquering it for the Safavid state.

== Strategic Context ==
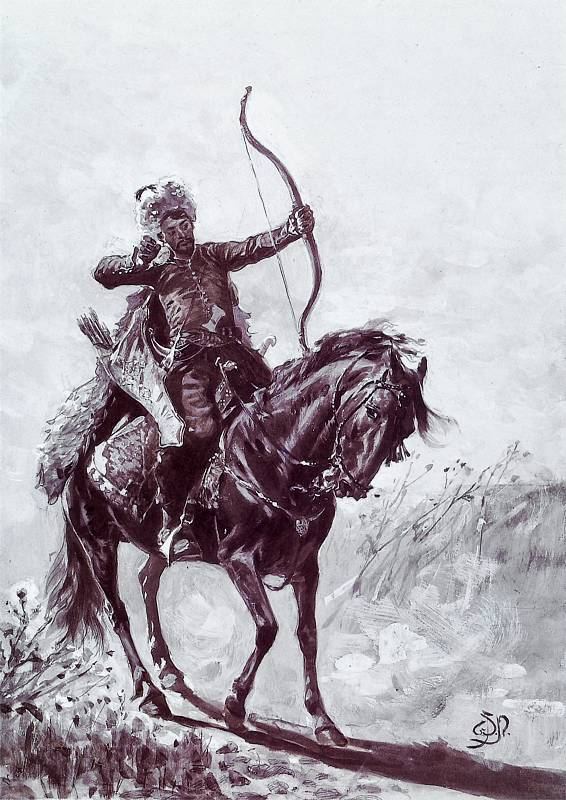
Nader's decisive victory at Baghavard destroyed any hope of the Crimean Tatars joining the main Ottoman army on the field.

The Caucasus had fallen under Ottoman control since 1722 with the collapse of the Safavid state. The first target of the campaign was the reconquering of the Shirvan Khanate, with its capital Shamakhi falling in August 1734 freeing up the Persian forces to march west and lay siege to Ganja. The battlements of Ganja as well as its garrison of 14,000 soldiers provided a formidable defence. After Tahmasp Khan Jalayer engaged and routed a joint Ottoman and Crimean Tatar force in the south east Caucasus Nader cut their line of retreat further west dealing them another crippling blow, scattering them into the mountains north.

The mountains to the north in Avarestan made any pursuit of the defeated foe a daunting prospect especially considering the approach of winter, so Nader chose to turn west and besiege Ganja where he was drawn into an intense effort to capture the surprisingly formidable fortress. The Persian artillery was still severely lacking in strong siege guns and consisted mostly of field batteries which were effective in battles but unable to make significant impact against city walls and battlements.

Failing in their siege artillery capacity the Persian sent sappers to dig underground to reach the citadels walls from beneath but the Turks received timely intelligence reports revealing the intention of the besiegers. Tunnelling underground the Persians and Ottomans burrowed into each other's way whence they came to grips in hand-to-hand combat. The Persians were able to detonate six charges killing 700 Ottoman defenders but still failed in their main object of destroying the citadels walls. The Persians also lost some 30 to 40 men themselves.

Nader also blockaded Yerevan and Tiflis forcing a response from the Ottoman 'Saraskar' Koprulu Pasha. Istanbul had found the preliminary negotiations by Ahmad Pasha, governor of Ottoman Baghdad unsatisfactory and sent an enormous army consisting of 50,000 cavalry, 30,000 janissaries and 40 cannon to be commanded by Koprulu Pasha foe the defence of Ottoman possessions in the region.

== The Battle of Yeghevārd ==
Nader having besieged many of the key cities and fortresses in the area awaited the arrival of Koprulu Pasha's main army of some 130,000 men according to Nader's court historian Mirza Mehdi Astarabadi, prompting Nader to gather his advance guard of around 15,000 men and march them westwards to engage the relief army under Koprulu Pasha. By the time the main Persian army of 40,000 reached the scene of the battle Nader, despite the enormous disparity in numbers, routed the Ottomans, forcing Istanbul to finally sign a peace recognizing Persian control of the Caucasus and the border in Mesopotamia already agreed to in the treaty of Zuhab.

The crushing defeat at Baghavard also provided sufficient persuasion to retreat for the 50,000 Crimean Tatars who were commanded by the Turkish Sultan to march south along the coast of the Black Sea descending down into the Caucasus in order to aid Koprulu Pasha's forces.

== See also ==
- Siege of Ganja
- Battle of Baghavard
- Nader Shah
- Ottoman–Persian War (1730–1735)

== Sources ==
- Moghtader, Gholam-Hussein(2008). The Great Batlles of Nader Shah, Donyaye Ketab
- Axworthy, Michael (2009). The Sword of Persia: Nader Shah, from tribal warrior to conquering tyrant, I. B. Tauris
- Ghafouri, Ali(2008). History of Iran's wars: from the Medes to now, Etela'at Publishing
