= Topal Osman Pasha =

Grand Vizier of the Ottoman Empire from 1731 to 1732

- 18th century Italian school Ottoman portrait of Topal Osman Pasha (1663-1733)

127th Grand Vizier of the Ottoman Empire
- In office 21 September 1731 – 12 March 1732
- Monarch: Mahmud I
- Preceded by: Kabakulak Ibrahim Pasha
- Succeeded by: Hekimoğlu Ali Pasha

Personal details
- Born: 1663 Morea, Peloponnese, Ottoman Empire
- Died: 1733 (aged 69–70) Kirkuk, Ottoman Iraq, Modern-day Kirkuk Governorate, Iraq

Military service
- Allegiance: Ottoman Empire
- Branch/service: Ottoman Army
- Rank: Beylerbey; Serasker; General
- Battles/wars: Ottoman–Venetian War (1714–1718); Ottoman–Persian War: Battle of Samarra (1733); Battle of Kirkuk (1733) †

Topal Osman Pasha (1663–1733) was an Ottoman military officer and administrator. A capable man, he rose to the rank of beylerbey by the age of 24 and served as general against the Venetians and the Habsburg monarchy and as governor in several provinces. His career eventually brought his appointment to the position of Grand Vizier in 1731–32. After his dismissal, he was sent to a provincial governorship, but was soon recalled to lead the Ottoman troops in the Ottoman–Persian War of 1730–35. He succeeded in defeating Nader Shah and saving Baghdad in 1733, but clashed with Nader for a second time and was decisively defeated in the Battle of Kirkuk (1733), in which he lost his life.

== Life ==
Osman was born ca. 1663 in the Morea (Peloponnese) peninsula to Turkish parents. His family was originally from Konya in Anatolia. At a young age he entered the Sultan's service, enrolling in the corps of the kozbekçi and then the pandurs. By the age of 24, he had already risen to the rank of beylerbey. Sent on a mission to the Governor of Egypt, his ship was attacked en route by a Spanish privateer. Osman was captured after a fight, in the course of which he received a wound which left him lame in one foot for life, earning him the epithet "Topal" (Turkish for "lame").

Taken initially to Malta, he was soon ransomed and returned to Istanbul (his captivity later inspired an episode in the opera Les Indes galantes). He then participated in the 1710–11 Pruth River Campaign, was appointed to the honorary post of kapıcıbaşı, and then sent to the Rumeli Eyalet where he served as commander of the Christian irregular militia, the armatoloi. In this role he served in the 1715 campaign that recovered the Morea from the Venetians, where he so distinguished himself that he was promoted to the rank of pasha with two horse-tails, and appointed governor of the Sanjak of Tirhala. During the opening operations of the Austro-Turkish War of 1716–18, he was in charge of supplying the army, but soon returned to the Morea (late 1716) as a pasha with three horse-tails (the highest rank) and serasker (commander-in-chief) of the Morea Eyalet, in order to suppress local revolts and prevent any Venetian attempts at recovering the province.

In 1720 he was appointed as governor of Bosnia, before being shifted to Rumeli in the next year. He remained at this post until 1727, when he returned to Bosnia for two years. In 1729 he was re-appointed to Rumeli, before being shifted back to Bosnia in 1730, and again to Rumeli in 1731. During this period, he eliminated the surviving supporters of the rebel Patrona Halil, who had taken refuge in the western Balkans, particularly Albania. On 10 September 1731, he was named Grand Vizier by Sultan Mahmud I. Although he served only for six months as Grand Vizier, he tried to enact reforms to stabilize the volatile situation in the capital, Istanbul, by stabilizing prices, restoring order and ensuring the city's supply with food. He also encouraged the efforts of the French army officer Claude Alexandre de Bonneval in reforming the humbaracı artillery corps after Western models.

After his dismissal, Topal Osman served briefly as governor of the Trebizond Eyalet and of Tiflis, before being recalled and, as the Empire's most experienced soldier, appointed serasker of Anatolia in the Ottoman–Persian War of 1730–35. In July 1733 he dealt a decisive defeat on the Persians, who under Nader Shah had invaded Iraq and were besieging Baghdad, at a hard-fought battle just north of Baghdad. Aided by Topal Osman's clever stratagems, the Ottomans inflicted some 30,000 casualties on Nader Shah's army and forced it to withdraw, although they lost 20,000 in turn. It was the only time that Nader Shah ever lost a battle.

However, Nader Shah repeated his invasion. Depite being numerically superior, Topal Osman was killed and his army routed near Kirkuk by the Persians. A Persian soldier cut off Topal Osman's head and brought it to Nader Shah, who, after ordering his opponent's corpse found, returned his remains to the Ottomans, out of deep respect for an adversary he considered to be worthy. They were buried with full honours in the Imam Qasim mosque in Kirkuk.

== Family ==
His son, Ahmed Ratib Pasha, had married Ayşe Sultan, a daughter of Sultan Ahmed III. His great-grandson was the noted writer and Young Ottoman political activist Namık Kemal.

== Sources ==
- Axworthy, Michael (2006). The Sword of Persia: Nader Shah, from Tribal Warrior to Conquering Tyrant. I. B. Tauris. ISBN 978-1-85043-706-2.
- Mantran, R. (2000). "Ṭopal ʿOt̲h̲mān Pas̲h̲a, 1. Grand Vizier (1663-1733)". In Bearman, P. J.; Bianquis, Th.; Bosworth, C. E.; van Donzel, E. & Heinrichs, W. P. (eds.). The Encyclopaedia of Islam, Second Edition. Volume X: T–U. Leiden: E. J. Brill. pp. 564–565. ISBN 978-90-04-11211-7.

Political offices
Preceded by unknown	Beylerbey of the Rumelia Eyalet; 1721–27	Succeeded by unknown
Preceded by unknown	Beylerbey of the Rumelia Eyalet; 1729–30	Succeeded by unknown
Preceded by unknown	Beylerbey of the Rumelia Eyalet; 1731	Succeeded by unknown
Preceded by Kabakulak Ibrahim Pasha	Grand Vizier of the Ottoman Empire; 10 September 1731 – 12 March 1732	Succeeded by Hekimoğlu Ali Pasha
