= Battle of Yeghevārd =

Final major engagement of the Perso-Ottoman War of 1730–35

- Part of the Ottoman–Persian War (1730–1735) and Nader's Campaigns
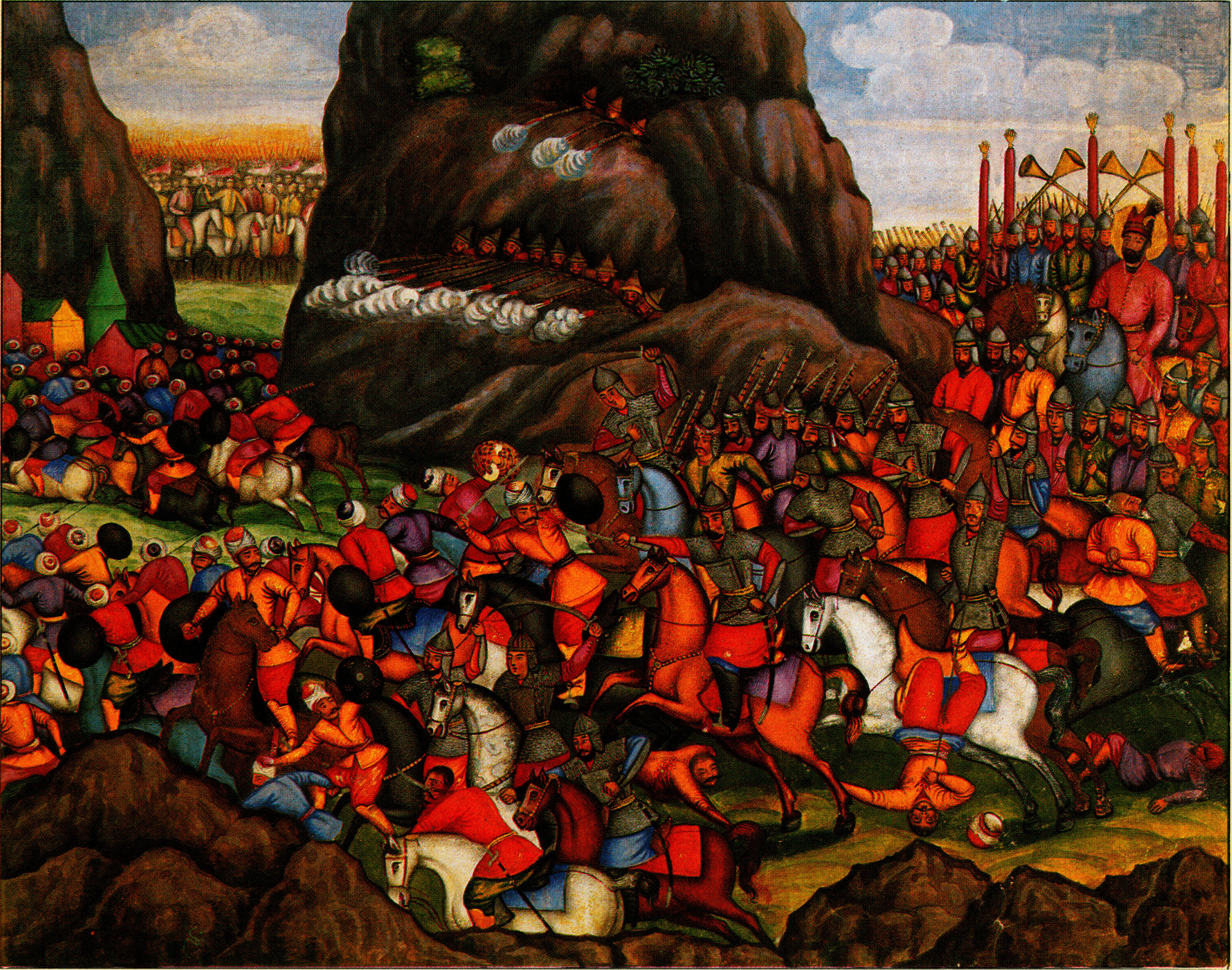
- Painting of the battle between the Persian and Ottoman armies. In the illustration, Nader was riding at the head of his troops. A unit of his elite jazāyerchi musketeers was hidden in the mountains, and shot down the fleeing Turkish troops as Nader's main force pushed them back.
Date	June 19, 1735
Location	Yeghevārd, Armenia (then Murattepe village of Erevan, Ottoman Empire)
Result	Safavid victory: Effective end of the war
Territorial changes	Surrender of numerous Ottoman-held cities and strongholds in the Caucasus including: Ganja; Tiflis; Yerevan

Belligerents
Safavid Iran	Ottoman Empire

Commanders and leaders
Nader Shah	Köprülü Abdullah Pasha †; Mustafa Pasha †

Strength
15,000 (Note: The main body of the Persian army, consisting of 40,000 soldiers, was not engaged as it seems it had not even arrived at the field of battle until Nader and his advance guard had already routed the Ottomans. It is possible however, that a portion of this main body did participate in the pursuit of the defeated Ottomans in the aftermath of the battle.): Dozens of cannons & hundreds of zamburaks	80,000: 50,000 Sipahi cavalry; 30,000 Janissary infantry; 40 cannons

Casualties and losses
Negligible	40,000–50,000 killed & wounded 32 cannons captured

The Battle of Yeghevārd, also known as the Battle of Baghavard or Morad Tapeh or Arpachai or Echmiadzin, was the final major engagement of the Ottoman–Persian War of (1730–1735) where the principal Ottoman army in the Caucasus theatre under Koprulu Pasha's command was utterly destroyed by only the advance guard of Nader's army before the main Persian army could enter into the fray. The complete rout of Koprulu Pasha's forces led to a number of besieged Ottoman strongholds in the theatre surrendering as any hope of relief proved ephemeral in light of the crushing defeat at Yeghevārd. One of Nader's most impressive battlefield victories, in which he decimated a force four or five times the size of his own, it helped establish his reputation as a military genius and stands alongside many of his other great triumphs such as at Karnal, Mihmandoost or Kirkuk.

== Background ==
The Caucasus theatre, alongside the Mesopotamian theatre was one of the key regions where Ottoman and Persian empires had fought for hegemony throughout much of early modern period. The collapse of the Safavid state during the 1720s due to the invasion of the Hotaki Afghans gave the Ottomans the opportunity to seize not only the Caucasian territories under Persian suzerainty but to also extend their borders deep into western Iran itself. After Nader's successful campaigns in western Persia and Ottoman Iraq the western frontier of the empire was once again secure. However to the north, the Ottomans were still entrenched and Istanbul had seen fit to reinforce the battlements with a fresh army under Koprulu Pasha to ensure the Caucasus remained under Ottoman rule.

On 3 November 1734 Nader arrived at the gates of Ganja after subduing Shirvan by capturing its capital Shamakhi in August 1734. The fortifications of Ganja so impressed Nader that he decided on a protracted siege of the city. Leaving behind a portion of his force around Ganja, he set off with the remainder towards Georgia and Armenia in the west, besieging Tbilisi and Yerevan respectively. Abdollah Koprulu Pasha exited Kars with an army of 50,000 cavalry, 30,000 infantry plus 40 guns in order to find and bring Nader's main force to battle with the purpose of lifting the sieges of Ottoman holdings in the region. Although primary sources give the figure of 120,000 Ottoman soldiers in total.

When news of Koprulu Pasha's entrance into area via crossing the Arpachay river the Armenian chronicler Abraham of Crete records Nader's reaction as being "praise be to god, I had been awaiting this moment for such a lengthy time" and immediately set out to meet him with his advance guard of 15,000–18,000. That night Nader camped on a high ground overlooking the plain nearby a forest.

== Battle ==
Hearing of Nader's proximity as well as the meagreness of his numbers, Koprulu Pasha hastened his approach. Nader, instead of falling back towards the main body of the Persian army, started to deploy his advance guard on the spot. Battle commenced at 2 o'clock in the afternoon with Nader, having deployed a contingent of troops in the nearby forest, led 3,000 men down onto the valley below beginning a skirmish with the Ottomans to fix their attention.

The Turks who were in the process of deploying a significant number of their guns on the crest of a small hill were caught completely off guard when Nader, in an aggressive manoeuvre, dispatched 2–3,000 of his elite musketeers (the jazāyerchis) to seize the hill. The Ottomans were driven off the hill and their precious artillery pieces were captured causing great dismay among the Ottoman soldiers who witnessed the ease with which their guns fell into enemy hands in just the opening phase of the battle.

Nader at this moment sent forward another unit in order to neutralise the other concentration of Ottoman artillery on the left, after which the order for the advance of the Persian centre was given. Nader's own artillery was augmented by the presence of 500 zamburaks (which were essentially swivel guns mounted on the back of camels, providing light manoeuvrable artillery). Although zamburaks were extremely vulnerable to cannon fire, all of the Ottoman guns had been silenced allowing the zamburaks to play a decisive role in the battle.

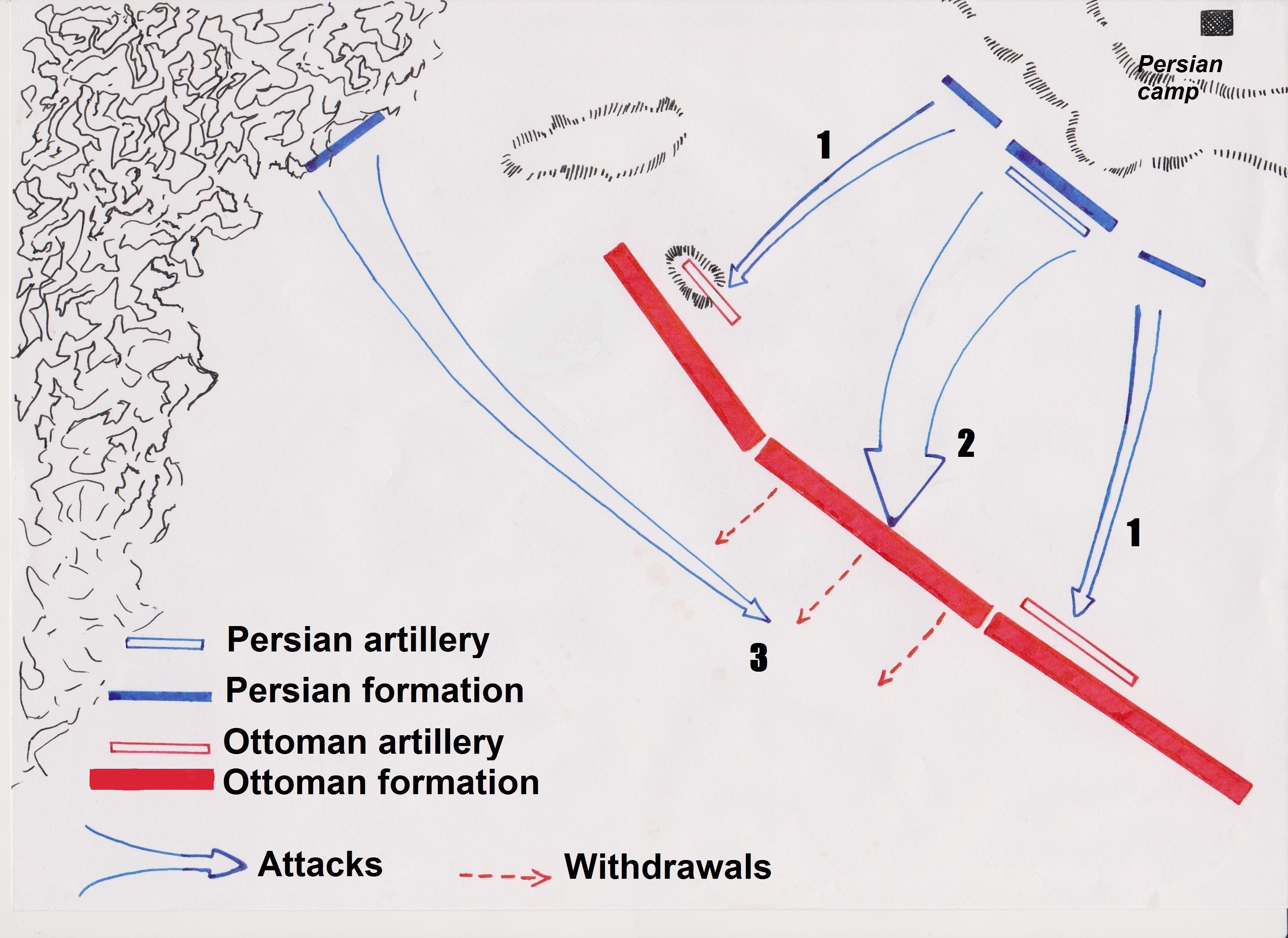
A visual interpretation of the battle of Yeghevārd: 1. After skirmishing in the centre fixes the Ottomans' attention, Nader orders aggressive attacks directed at neutralising the main concentrations of Ottoman artillery; 2. The Persian centre advances against its Ottoman counterpart which is devastated by focused artillery fire by Persian cannons & zamburaks, forcing the Ottomans back; 3. Nader at this point signals his hidden contingent of troops from the nearby forest to flank the disorganized Ottomans, helping to completely rout them off the field

Now the Persian artillery came into play supporting the centre's advance into the heart of the Ottoman line by a murderous volley of round shot in addition to the half a thousand zamburaks that unleashed a devastating fire on the Ottoman centre which, having been thrown into disarray, subsequently fell back as the Persians centre closed on them. In all, the Persian cannons fired over 300 rounds not including the zamburaks while the Ottoman guns fired a pathetic two or three times before being silenced for the remainder of the battle.

At this crucial juncture, with the Ottoman centre thrown back and reeling in confusion, Nader summoned his contingent of troops hidden away at the edge of the nearby forest to settle the matter decisively by a brilliant flanking manoeuvre, converting the Ottoman's disarray into a headlong rout. Nader put himself at the head of 1,000 chosen horsemen to seal the path of retreat on his foe.

Koprulu Pasha was set upon during the rout by a Persian soldier by the name of Rostam who threw him from his horse, knocking him unconscious just prior to beheading him and taking the morbid trophy back to camp in order to present it to Nader. Many other high-ranking generals were also slaughtered and their troops fared even worse, being pursued and butchered all the way back to the Arpachay River. The massacre of the Ottoman soldiers was such that Nader himself later wrote (with little exaggeration) that "we made a butchery of all the Janissaries; not a single one of them could make away with his life" and that "an overwhelming number of the Ottoman cavalry... almost all of them were killed by the grace of god".

8,000 soldiers made their way back to Kars out of the original number of 80,000 while Persian casualties were minuscule.

Nader himself, writing to the prince of Gulytsin, claimed "never in any of my wars have I been as fortunate" and was content enough to order a monument to be built on the high ground upon which he had set up camp the night prior to the battle. The strategic ramifications of the battle were felt almost immediately throughout the Caucasus with Ganja and Tbilisi surrendering in despair though Yerevan held out until Nader, crossing the Aparchay river blockaded Kars and the Ottomans were convinced to exchange Yerevan for the lifting of the blockade on October 13, 1735.

== Aftermath ==
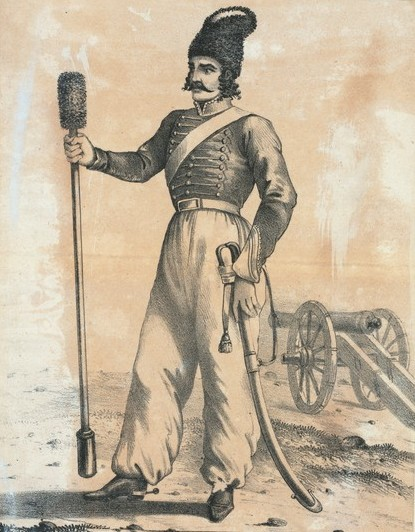
An illustration of a Persian artilleryman

=== Events in Europe ===
Emboldened by the disastrous defeats of the Ottomans at the hands of Nader and seizing on the pretext that an army of Tatars had violated the sovereignty of Russia by marching along the black sea coast to join Koprulu Pasha against Nader's forces, Russia soon entered into military operations against the Ottoman Empire, eventually capturing Azov. Austria also chose this moment to simultaneously join in a war against Istanbul, however they did not share their Russian ally's success on the field suffering a catastrophic defeat at Grocka.

=== Nader Marches North ===
After his most successful campaign to date Nader lingered on appointing new governors to his newly acquired cities and kingdoms before setting out against the Lezgians in southern Daghestan. The Tatars who had marched all the way from Crimea, on receiving news of Koprulu Pasha's demise as well of that of his army, turned and hastened back north along the black sea coast. The Lezgians however proved an altogether much tougher foe especially with the advent of the winter snow in the tight restricted mountain passes of northern Daghestan. The Lezgian leader was defeated in June 1736 and fled to the Avars with many of his subjects making peace with Nader. Having largely pacified the Caucasus he left for Persia where he would overthrow the Shāhanshāh and establish his own dynasty.

== See also ==
- Siege of Ganja
- Ottoman–Persian War (1730–1735)
- Caucasus Campaign (1735)
- Treaty of Ganja
- Treaty of Constantinople
- Second Battle of Yeghevārd

== Sources ==
- Moghtader, Gholam-Hussein (2008). The Great Batlles of Nader Shah, Donyaye Ketab
- Axworthy, Michael (2009). The Sword of Persia: Nader Shah, from tribal warrior to conquering tyrant, I. B. Tauris
- Ghafouri, Ali (2008). History of Iran's wars: from the Medes to now, Etela'at Publishing
