= Imperial School of Military Engineering =

Military engineering academy

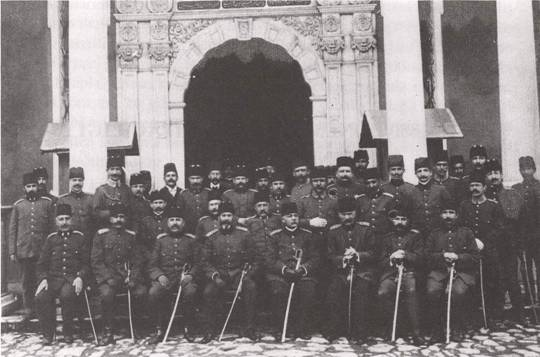
Teaching staff in front of the entrance gate of the school in the 1900s

The Imperial School of Military Engineering (Ottoman Turkish: مهندسخانۂ برئ همايون ; Ottoman Turkish: Mühendishâne-i Berrî-i Hümâyun) was an Ottoman military engineering academy in Hasköy, Constantinople. It was opened in 1795 during the reign of Selim III and continued functioning until 1928, until the opening of the High Engineering School (Turkish: Yüksek Mühendislik Mektebi).

It was formed as an important institution in the Nizam-ı Cedid reforms and was formed with the expansion of the Imperial Naval Engineering School (Mühendishâne-i Bahrî-i Hümâyun), which had been the first modern engineering school of the Ottoman Empire and the only one to precede the Imperial School of Military Engineering. The location was chosen its Hasköy due to its remoteness at the time to prevent students, along with humbaracıs and lağımcıs that were to be located adjacent to the school from coming into contact with the Janissaries in Constantinople. The construction work began on 14 July 1793 and ended in September 1795. The initial policy had been not to include any foreigners in the staff, which led to the four scholars, Hüseyin Rıfkı Tamani, İbrâhim Kâmi, Hâfız Seyyid İbrâhim Edhem and Elhac Hâfız Abdullah be the only ones to teach at the institution under Abdurrahman Efendi, a scholar of geometry and algebra until 1801, when a scholar of English origin was employed. Later, under head instructor (Başhoca) Ishak Efendi, who was an 1815 graduate of the school and had been appointed the deputy principal of the then-principal Hüseyin Rıfkı Tamani in 1816, and who oversaw the school between 1830 until his death in 1836, the school saw great improvement and an attempt to apply the curriculum of French schools of engineering.

Despite its being a military school, civilians were also allowed to enroll. Selim III worked to provide all necessary facilities to the school, including the import of equipment from Europe and the establishment of a printing press. The school consisted of four years. In the first year, the students studied calligraphy, spelling, painting, Arabic, French, numbers and an introduction to geometry. In the second year, they studied arithmetic, advanced geometry, Arabic, French and geography. In the third year, they studied geography, planar trigonometry, algebra, surveying and military history. In the fourth year, they studied cross-sections of cones, differentiation, integration, mechanics, ballistics, astronomy, fortifications and shooting practice. The fourth year curriculum required knowledge of advanced mathematics. Mining as a part of the military (lağımcılık), map drawing and artillery were among other areas studied.

Harp Okulları, itself a successor of the High Engineering School, is a direct successor of the Mühendishâne-i Berrî-i Hümâyun.
