= Humbaracı =

Military unit of Ottoman army

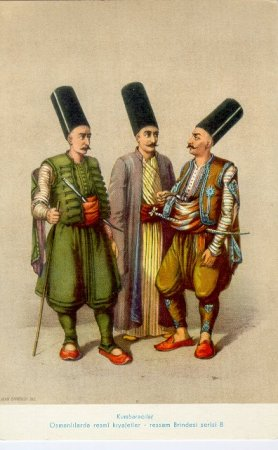
- Active: 16th century–1826
- Allegiance: Ottoman Empire
- Type: Bombardier, mortar
- Size: Around 600
- Garrison/HQ: Hasköy, Istanbul

Commanders
- Notable commanders: Humbaracı Ahmet Paşa

Insignia
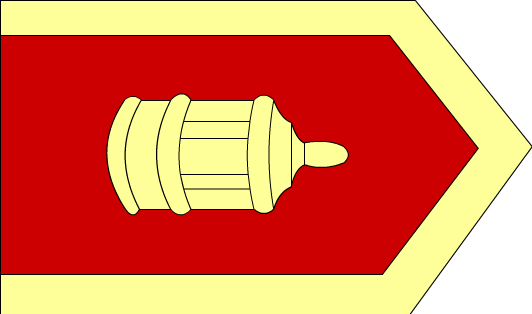
- Identification symbol

Humbaracı corps were bombardier and mortar troops of the Ottoman army.

== Name ==
Humbara (also pronounced kumbara) was derived from the Persian word hum-i pare (metal bowl or casing to store money). Due to the similarity of the shape of the projectiles, in Ottoman Turkish, it was used to name the bombshells cast from iron or bronze.

In modern Turkish, it also denotes the earthenware money box used by kids, basically a metal piggy bank.

== History ==
In the 16th century, Mustafa, an artillery officer in the Ottoman army established a workshop to cast humbaras in order to give the fire power of the artillery to the mobilized infantry groups.

== Ammunition ==
Humbaras could be cast by two ways:

- Humbara-i dest: thrown by hand
- Humbara-i kebir: thrown with an apparatus

== Garrison ==
Humbaracı Kışlası or Kumbarahane ("Humbaracı Garrison") was located in the Hasköy district of the Istanbul, on the coast of Haliç. The street in front of the barracks are still called "Kumabarahane Street".

As considered one the first example of military garrisons, it included casting workshop, stable, training ground, kitchen, mosque, hospital, and shops. Garrison was also home lağımcılar, corresponds to sapper in modern armies.

On 1795, the garrison was expanded to include the Imperial School of Military Engineering.

After the modernization of the Army and dissolving of the corps, barracks were used as a medical school: the Mekteb-i Tıbbiye-i Şahane.
