= Claude Alexandre, Count of Bonneval =

French and Ottoman army officer (1675–1747)

Claude Alexandre, Count of Bonneval (14 July 1675 – 23 March 1747), was a French army officer who later went into the service of the Ottoman Empire, eventually converting to Islam and becoming known as Humbaracı Ahmet Paşa.

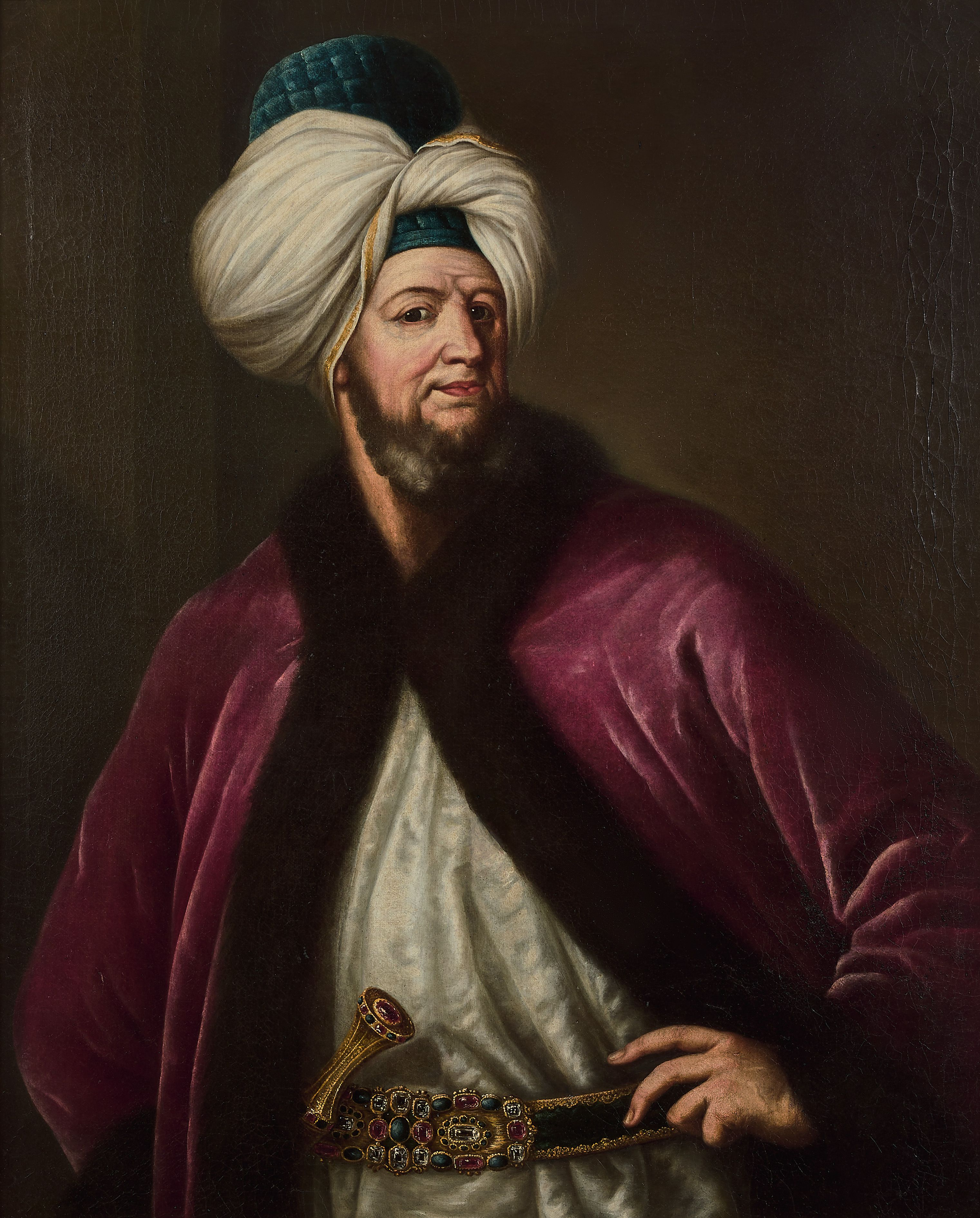
Portrait of Claude Alexandre de Bonneval in Turkish dress, painted in Florence in 1750 by Italian artist Violante Beatrice Siries (Limoges Museum of Fine Arts)

== Life ==
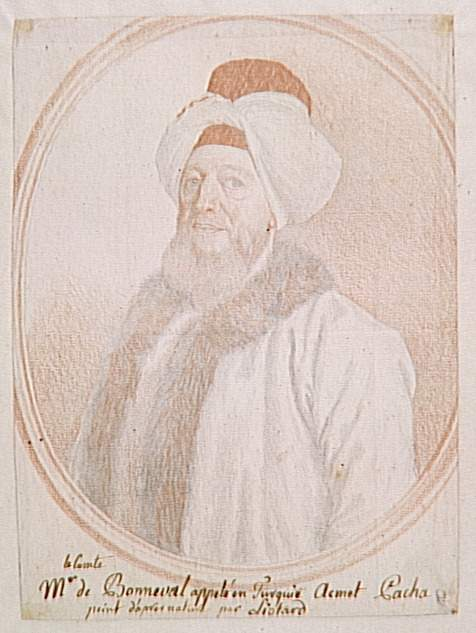
Claude Alexandre de Bonneval as Humbaracı Ahmet Paşa, illustrated by Jean-Étienne Liotard

Descended from an old noble family of Limousin, France, originally knights of the castle in the viscounty of Ségur, Bonneval was sent to a Jesuit college after his father’s death. Admiral and Marshal of France, Tourville, a relative considered by some as one of the most talented naval officers in French military history, secured his entry into the navy at the age of thirteen. He distinguished himself in the battles of Dieppe, La Hougue, and Cadiz, where Marshal de Tourville commanded the French fleet. Disillusioned with the navy following a matter of honor, Bonneval purchased a commission in the elite French Guards Regiment in 1698, where he remained until 1701.

The descendant of an old family of Limousin, France, Alexandre joined the Royal Marine Corps at the age of thirteen. After three years he entered the army and eventually rose to command a regiment. He served in the Italian campaigns under Catinat, Villeroy and Vendôme, and in the Netherlands under Luxembourg, showing indomitable courage and great military ability. However, his insolent attitude towards the minister of war led to a court martial (1704) in which he was condemned to death. He saved himself by fleeing to Germany.

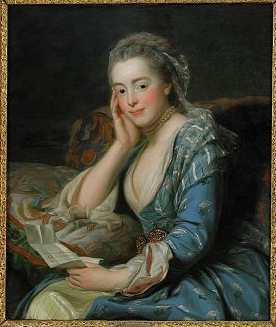
Judith Charlotte, Countess of Bonneval, née de Gontaut, painted by Alexander Roslin

Through the influence of Prince Eugene of Savoy he obtained a general's command in the Austrian army, and fought with great bravery and distinction against France and afterwards against the Ottoman Empire. In 1706 he removed and then lost the only manuscript of Rutilius Namatianus from Bobbio in Italy.

He was present at the Battle of Malplaquet in 1709 and was severely wounded at Petrovaradin. The proceedings against him in France were then allowed to drop, and he visited Paris and married Judith-Charlotte, a daughter of Marshal-Duke of Biron. Shortly afterwards he returned to the Austrian army and fought with distinction at the Siege of Belgrade.

He might have risen to the highest rank, had he not made himself disagreeable to Prince Eugene, who sent him as master of the ordnance to the Low Countries. There his ungovernable temper led him into a quarrel with the Marquis de Prié, Eugene's deputy governor in the Netherlands, who answered his challenge by placing him in confinement. He was again court martialled and condemned to death although the emperor commuted the sentence to one year's imprisonment and banishment. Bonneval was returned to Vienna, stripped of his rank, titles and honours, and exiled to Venice.

Soon after his release, Bonneval offered his services to the Turkish government, professed Islam and took the name of Ahmed. He was made a pasha, and appointed to organise and command the Turkish artillery, eventually contributing to the Austrian defeat at Niš and the subsequent end of the Austrian-Ottoman war marked by the Treaty of Belgrade, where Austria lost northern Serbia with Belgrade, Lesser Wallachia, and territories in northern Bosnia.

He was also close friends with a well-respected local mullah, Ismail Pasha.

In his Histoire de ma vie, the Venetian Giacomo Casanova described his meeting, at the age of 19, with the Count de Bonneval in Constantinople, giving his Muslim name as Osman rather than Ahmed.

He rendered valuable services to the sultan in his war with Russia, and with the famous Nader Shah of Iran. As a reward he received the governorship of Chios. However, he then fell under the suspicion of the Sublime Porte (the Ottoman administration) and was banished for a time to the shores of the Black Sea. He died at Constantinople in March 1747 and is buried in the cemetery attached to the Galata, Mevlevihane. Kumbaracı Sokaği, also in Galata, is named after him (kumbaracı being the modern spelling for humbaracı), making him a rare foreigner to have received such an accolade in modern Istanbul.

The Memoirs published under his name are spurious.

- Prince de Ligne, Mémoire sur le comte de Bonneval (Paris, 1817);
- A. Vandal, Le Pacha Bonneval (Paris, 1885).

== See also ==
- Franco-Ottoman alliance
- Humbaracı
