= Siege of Ganja (1734–1735) =

Siege in the Ottoman–Persian War

- Part of the Ottoman–Persian War (1730–1735) and Nader's Campaigns
| Date | 3 November 1734 – 9 July 1735 |
| Location | Ganja (present-day Azerbaijan Republic) |
| Result | Safavid victory |
| Territorial changes | Recapture of the city |

Belligerents
| Safavid Iran | Ottoman Empire |

Commanders and leaders
| Nader Shah | Ganj Ali Pasha (surrendered) |

Strength
| Unknown | 50,000 |

Casualties and losses
| 30–40 | 700 |

The siege of Ganja (Persian: محاصره گنجه), during the last phase of the Ottoman–Persian War (1730–1735), resulted in the surrender of the city by its Ottoman garrison after the main Turkish army marching to its relief was decisively defeated at the battle of Baghavard.

== The siege ==
In the aftermath of routing an Ottoman army and scattering it across the mountains of Avarestan, Nader marched west arriving at the gates of Ganja on 3 November when he set upon the task of the city's encirclement. The Ottoman garrison of 14,000 withdrew to the citadel where they awaited the Persian onslaught. Nader ordered a few guns be deployed on the roof of a mosque but the artillery battery was put out of action by the Ottoman cannon before it could even begin its bombardment of the citadel's battlements.

Failing in their siege artillery capacity, the Persian sent sappers to dig underground to reach the citadel's walls from beneath but the Turks received timely intelligence reports revealing the intention of the besiegers. Tunnelling underground the Persians and Ottomans burrowed into each other's way whence they came to grips in hand-to-hand combat. The Persians were able to detonate six charges killing 700 Ottoman defenders but still failed in their main object of destroying the citadel's walls. The Persians also lost some 30 to 40 men themselves.

Nader partook in these efforts from a dangerously close range, once having the brains and blood of one of his bodyguards splatter across his face as a cannonball fired from a Turkish gun decapitated him in the most grotesque manner. The Russians also sent some support in that they dispatched an engineer as well as a few siege guns although these did very little in progressing the battle.

== The siege ends ==
Reports began to reach Nader of Koprulu Pasha's departure from Kars with the intent of engaging the Persian army. Nader who at this point was all too eager to leave the slow-going siege and take to the field where he would be in his element once more, welcomed this opportunity to seek out the Ottoman relief force and crush it. Having invested his troops round Tiflis and Yerevan also Nader took the remainder of his men and marched west. An Ottoman army of perhaps 130,000 men (according to Astarabadi, Nader's court historian) under Koprulu Pasha was decimated by Nader's advance guard of only 15,000 or so men at the battle of Baghavard.

The obliteration of any hope the Ganja garrison had of outside relief by Koprulu pasha's demise as well of that of his army induced enough despair in the hearts of the garrison that they finally gave up and surrendered on 9 July 1735.

== Sources ==
- Moghtader, Gholam-Hussein(2008). The Great Battles of Nader Shah, Donyaye Ketab
- Axworthy, Michael (2009). The Sword of Persia: Nader Shah, from tribal warrior to conquering tyrant, I. B. Tauris
- Ghafouri, Ali(2008). History of Iran's wars: from the Medes to now, Etela'at Publishing
