= Ottoman–Persian War (1730–1735) =

Series of conflicts fought between the Ottoman Empire and Safavid Iran from 1730 to 1735

- Part of Nader's Campaigns and the Ottoman–Persian Wars
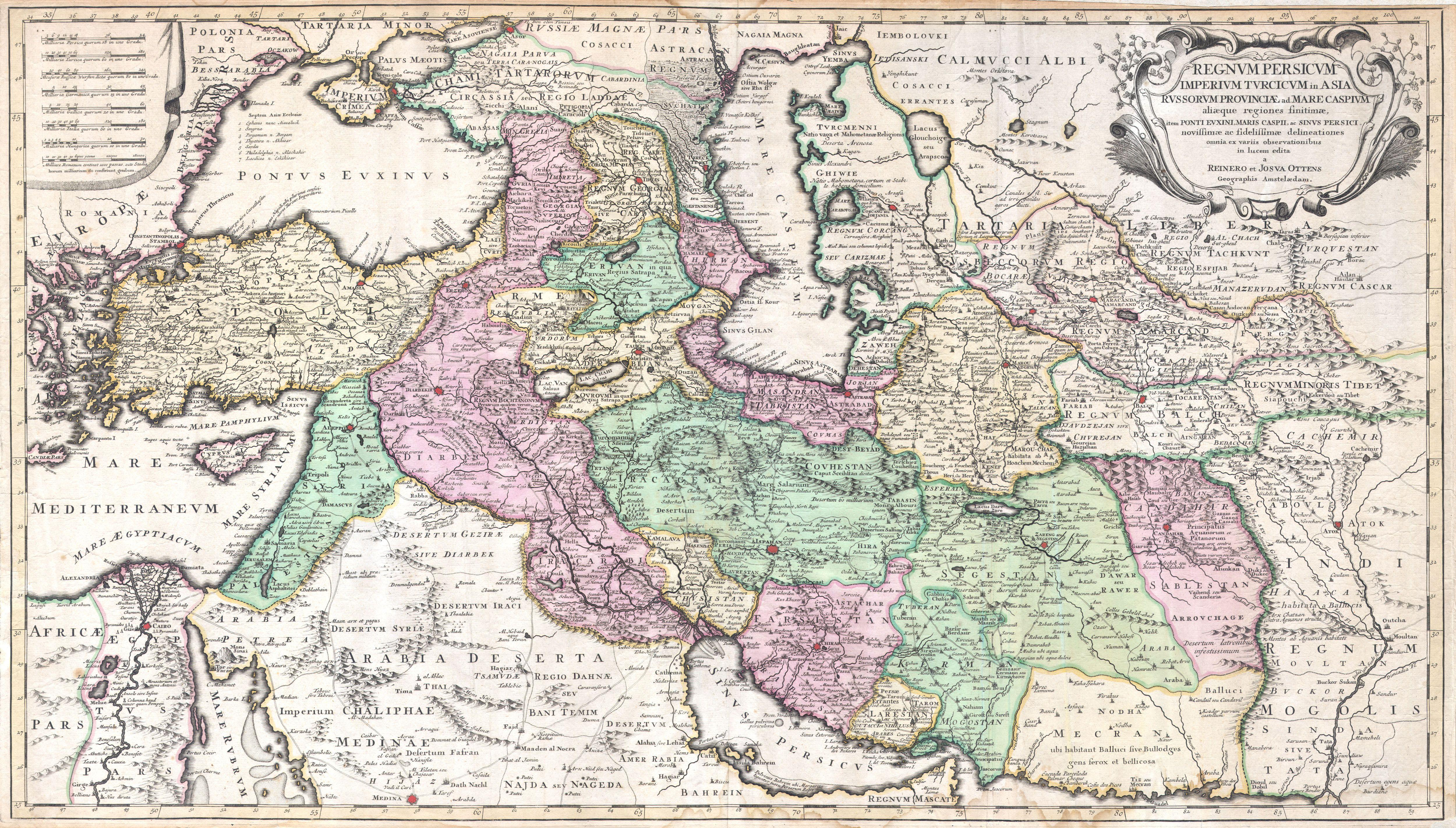
- The Ottoman and Iranian Empires in the Near East during the 18th century
Date	1730–1735
Location	Caucasus, Ottoman Iraq, Western Persia
Result	Persian victory: Treaty of Constantinople; Treaty of Ganja
Territorial changes	Expulsion of the Ottomans from western Persia; Nader re-establishes Iranian suzerainty over the Caucasus; Russian withdrawal from Caucasia

Belligerents
Safavid Iran	Ottoman Empire; Crimean Khanate; Gazikumukh Khanate; Lezgins

Commanders and leaders
(Safavid Iran) Nader (de facto Shah) (Safavid Iran) Tahmasp II (Deposed by Nader) (Safavid Iran) Abbas III (Vassal of Nader)	Sultan Mahmud I Topal Osman Pasha †; Hekimoğlu Ali Pasha; Köprülü Abdullah Pasha †; Ahmed Pasha; Surkhay I (AWOL)

Strength
Mesopotamian campaign: 200,000 men	Mesopotamian campaign: 200,000 men

Casualties and losses
Mesopotamian campaign: 30,000 casualties Caucasus campaign: Minimal casualties	Mesopotamian campaign: 60,000 casualties Caucasus campaign: 50,000 casualties

The Ottoman–Persian War of 1730–1735 was a conflict between the forces of Safavid Iran and those of the Ottoman Empire from 1730 to 1735. After Ottoman support had failed to keep the Ghilzai Afghan invaders on the Iranian throne, the Ottoman possessions in western Iran, which were granted to them by the Hotak dynasty, came under risk of re-incorporation into the newly resurgent Iranian Empire. The talented Safavid general, Nader, gave the Ottomans an ultimatum to withdraw, which the Ottomans chose to ignore. A series of campaigns followed, with each side gaining the upper hand in a succession of tumultuous events that spanned half a decade. Finally, the Iranian victory at Yeghevard made the Ottomans sue for peace and recognize Iranian territorial integrity and Iranian hegemony over the Caucasus.

== Events ==
In the spring of 1730, Nader attacked the Ottomans and regained most of the territory lost during the collapse of the Safavid government in the late 1720s. The Abdali Afghans which had been subdued in an earlier campaign rebelled and besieged Mashhad, forcing Nader to suspend his campaign and save his brother, Ebrahim who was trapped in Mashhad. It took Nader fourteen months to defeat the Abdali Afghans, who put up fierce resistance.

Relations between Nader and the Shah had declined as the latter grew jealous of his general's military successes. While Nader was absent in the east, Tahmasp tried to assert himself by launching a foolhardy campaign to recapture Yerevan. He ended up losing all of Nader's recent gains to the Ottomans, and signed a treaty ceding Georgia and Armenia in exchange for Tabriz. Nader saw that the moment had come to ease Tahmasp from power. He denounced the treaty, seeking popular support for a war against the Ottomans. In Isfahan, Nader got Tahmasp drunk then showed him to the courtiers, asking if a man in such a state was fit to rule. In 1732, he forced Tahmasp to abdicate in favor of the Shah's baby son, Abbas III, to whom Nader became regent.

Nader decided he could win back the territory in Armenia and Georgia by seizing Ottoman Iraq and then offering it in exchange for the lost provinces, but his plan went badly amiss when his army was routed by the Ottoman general Topal Osman Pasha near the city in 1733. Nader decided he needed to regain the initiative as soon as possible to save his position because revolts were already breaking out in Persia. He faced Topal again and defeated and killed him. He then besieged Ganja in the northern provinces, earning a Russian alliance against the Ottomans. Nader scored a great victory over a superior Ottoman force at the Battle of Yeghevārd and by the summer of 1735, Armenia and Georgia were his again. In March 1735, he signed a treaty with the Russians in Ganja by which the latter agreed to withdraw all of their troops from Persian territory.

== Aftermath ==
The success of Nader's campaigns were such that his prestige swayed many of the Persian elites, and he capitalised on the opportunity to overthrow the Safavids and establish his own, the Afsharid dynasty. Nader's next campaign took him to Qandahar where he overthrew the Ghilzai tribe's ruling Hotaki dynasty once and for all before going on to invade India. Nader also launched his first campaign against the Lezgis during the Perso-Ottoman war of 1730–1735.

== See also ==
- Ottoman–Hotaki War (1726–1727)
- Ottoman–Persian War (1743–1746)
- Ottoman–Persian Wars
- Russo-Turkish War (1735–1739)
